= Wangler (disambiguation) =

A wangler is someone who resorts to trickery.

Wangler may also refer to:

- John Wangler (born 1958), former American footballer
- Kenny Wangler, a character in the HBO drama Oz
- Martin Wangler (born 1969), German actor and cabaret artist
- Wangler da Silva (born 1992), Brazilian footballer

== See also ==
- Wängle, a village in Austria
