= Weißtannenhöhe =

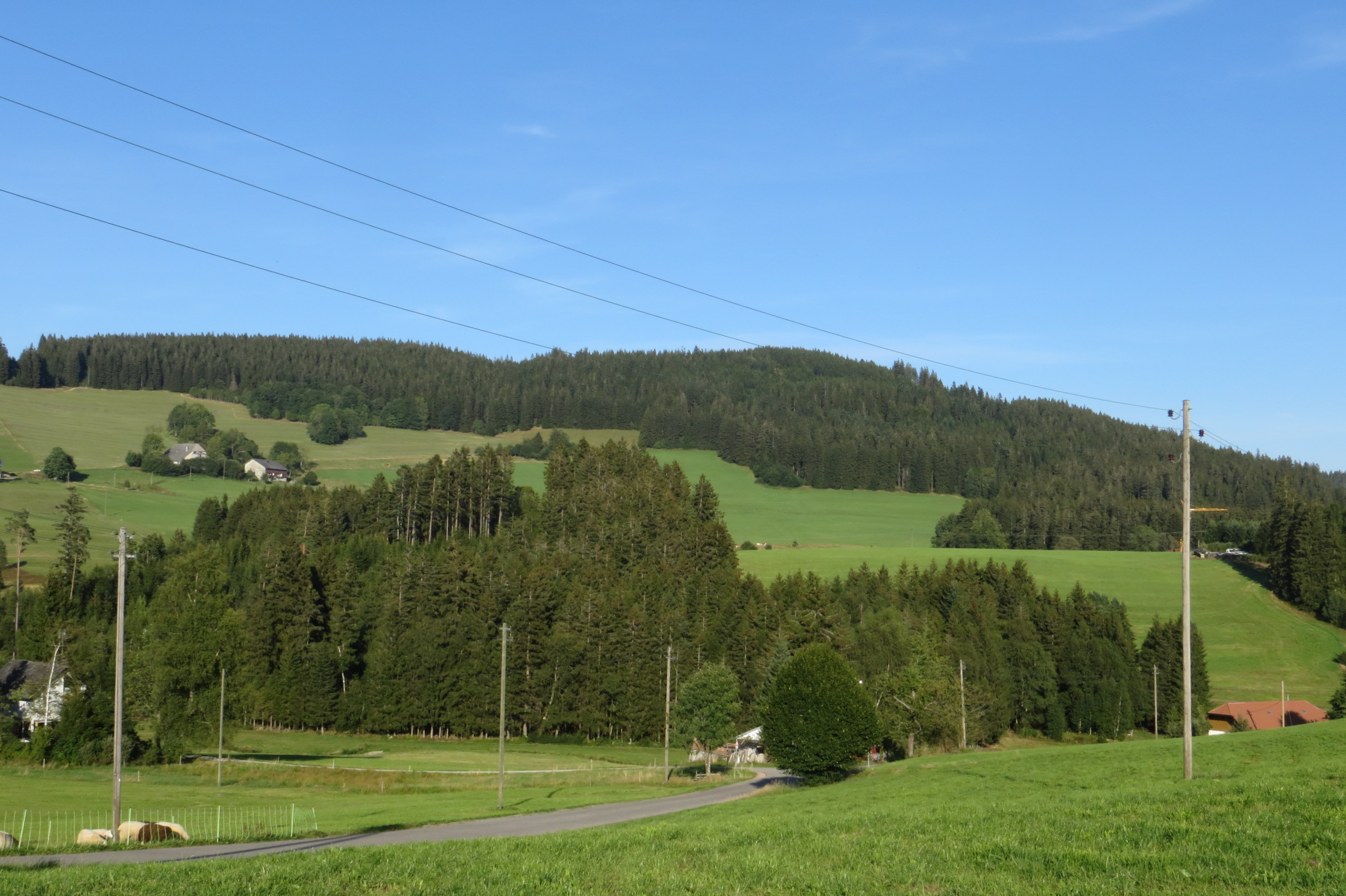
- The Weißtannenhöhe seen from Tiefen to the west.

Highest point
- Elevation: 1,190 m above sea level (NHN) (3,900 ft) or 1,192 m above sea level (NHN) (3,911 ft)
- Isolation: 5.47 km (3.40 mi) to Windeckkopf
- Coordinates: 47°56′24.32″N 8°7′3.23″E

Geography
- Location within Baden-Württemberg
- Location: Breitnau, Baden-Württemberg, Germany
- Parent range: Black Forest

The Weißtannenhöhe is a mountain, 1,190 or 1,192 metres high, in the Black Forest in Germany and the highest point in the municipality of Breitnau.

== Geography ==
The Weißtannenhöhe lies within the municipality of Breitnau in the county of Breisgau-Hochschwarzwald in the German state of Baden-Wuerttemberg. It rises about 3 kilometres east of the church in Breitnau, 4 kilometres north-northeast of Hinterzarten and 5 kilometres north-northwest of Lake Titisee. Across the Oberbach valley, 2 kilometres to the west, is the Roßberg (1,125 m) and, 1,500 metres beyond that, is the Hohwart (1,120 m). There are several viewing points in the vicinity of the mountain with good views over the local countryside, the Feldberg region, the Upper Rhine Plain and the Vosges.

On the western slopes of the Weißtannenhöhe rise numerous springs for the Ödenbach, one of the main headstreams of the Ravenna which flows through the well known Ravenna Gorge.

== History ==
In 1928, two cousins from Mannheim, Luise (25) and Ida Gersbach (35), were reported missing from their hiking holiday in the Black Forest. Their bodies were found in bushes on the Weißtannenhöhe and showed no signs of having been sexually assaulted. They had been shot in the head and their throats slit with a knife. Despite help from the public and even from mediums, Freiburg police were unable to solve the double murder.

== Summit ==
The summit region is covered by a dense evergreen forest, although there is a viewing point below it and about 100 metres to the west, facing Breitnau.

== Access ==
The Weißtannenhöhe is well served by footpaths and long distance trails. The Westweg and E1 European long distance path pass over the summit. Both trails run from the car park on the Black Forest High Road at Ramshalde, about 2 kilometres from the top, and from Titisee, a distance of over 6 kilometres. Numerous other trails run up or over the mountain from the nearby hamlets of Tiefen, Winterhalden, Eckbach, Siedelbach and Fürsatzhöhe.
