= Southern Black Forest =

Geographic region in Germany

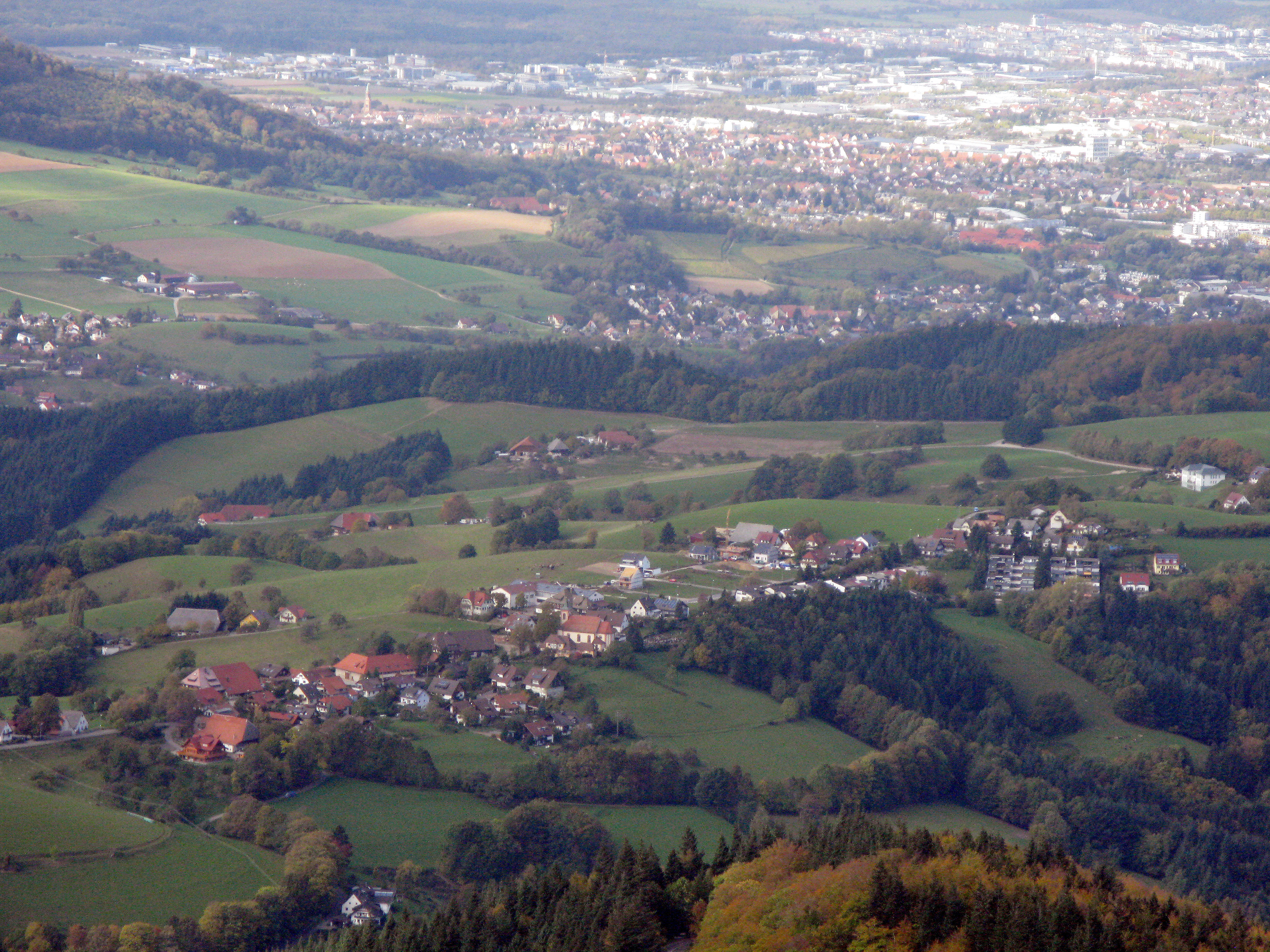
View from Schauinsland of Horben (foreground) and Freiburg (background)

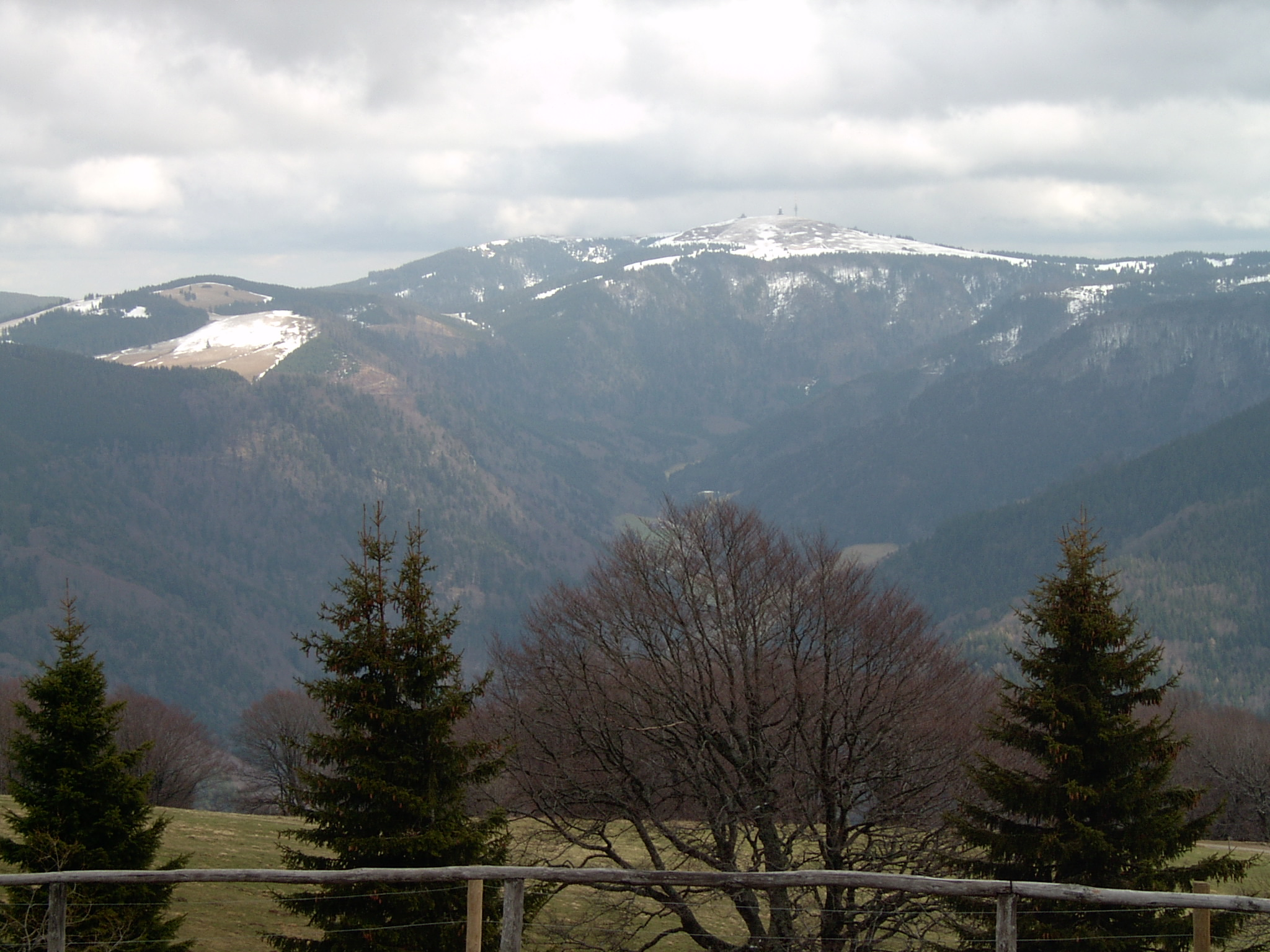
View from Schauinsland (1,284 m) of St. Wilhelm's valley and the Feldberg (1,493 m)

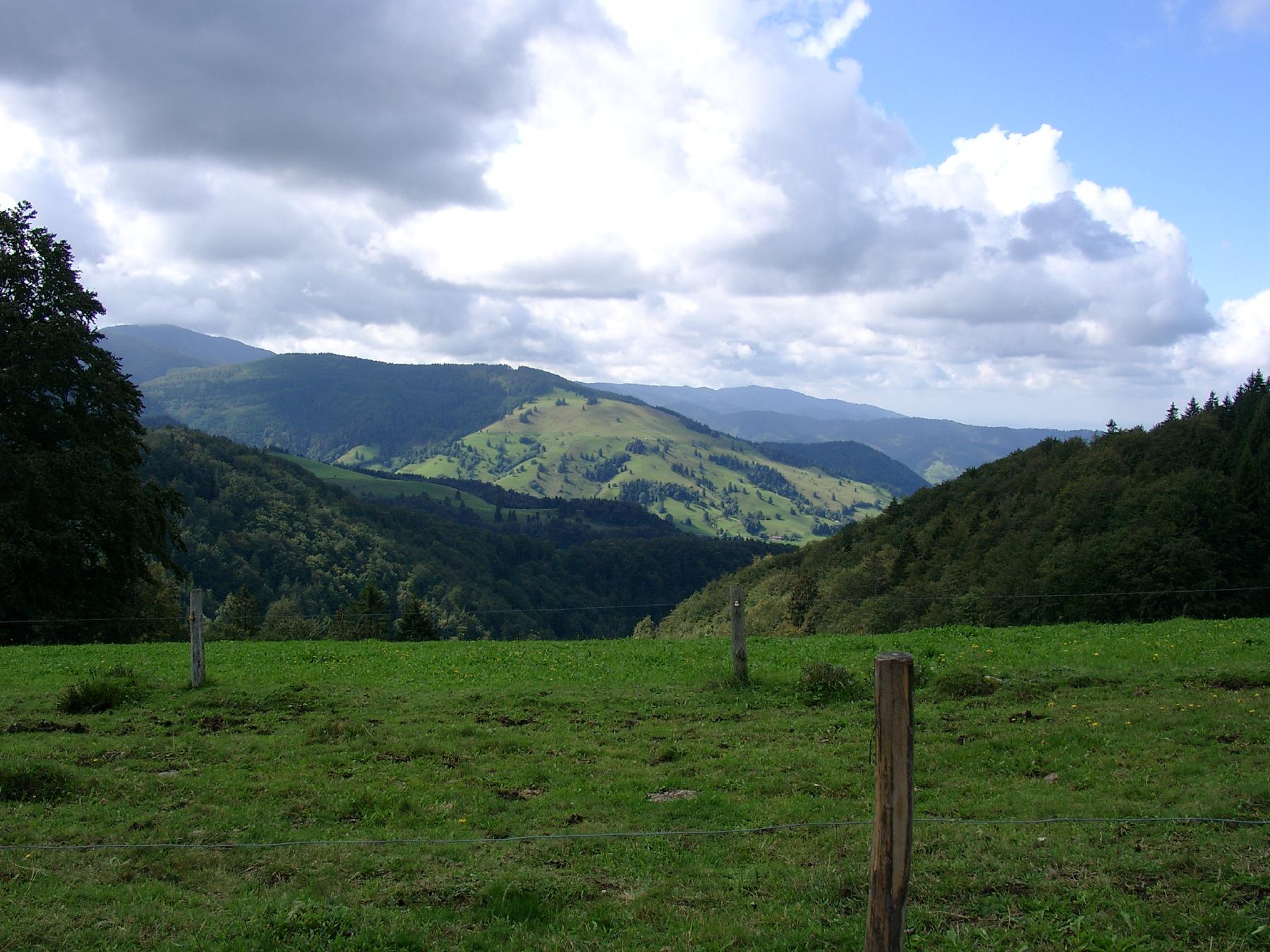
View over the Upper Münster valley of Belchen (1,414 m, left) and Blauen (1,165 m)

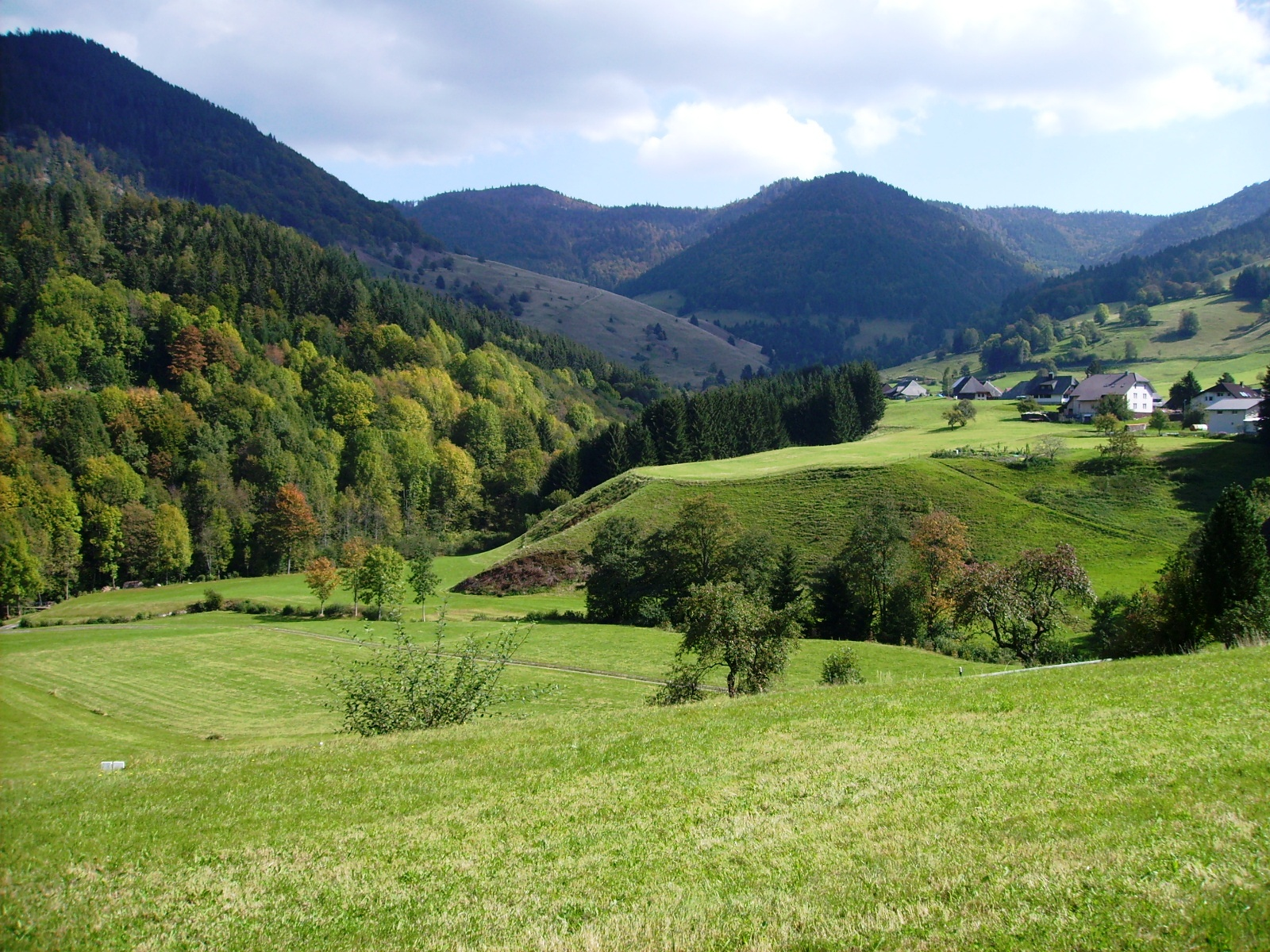
The Präg Bowl near Todtnau in the upper Wiese valley

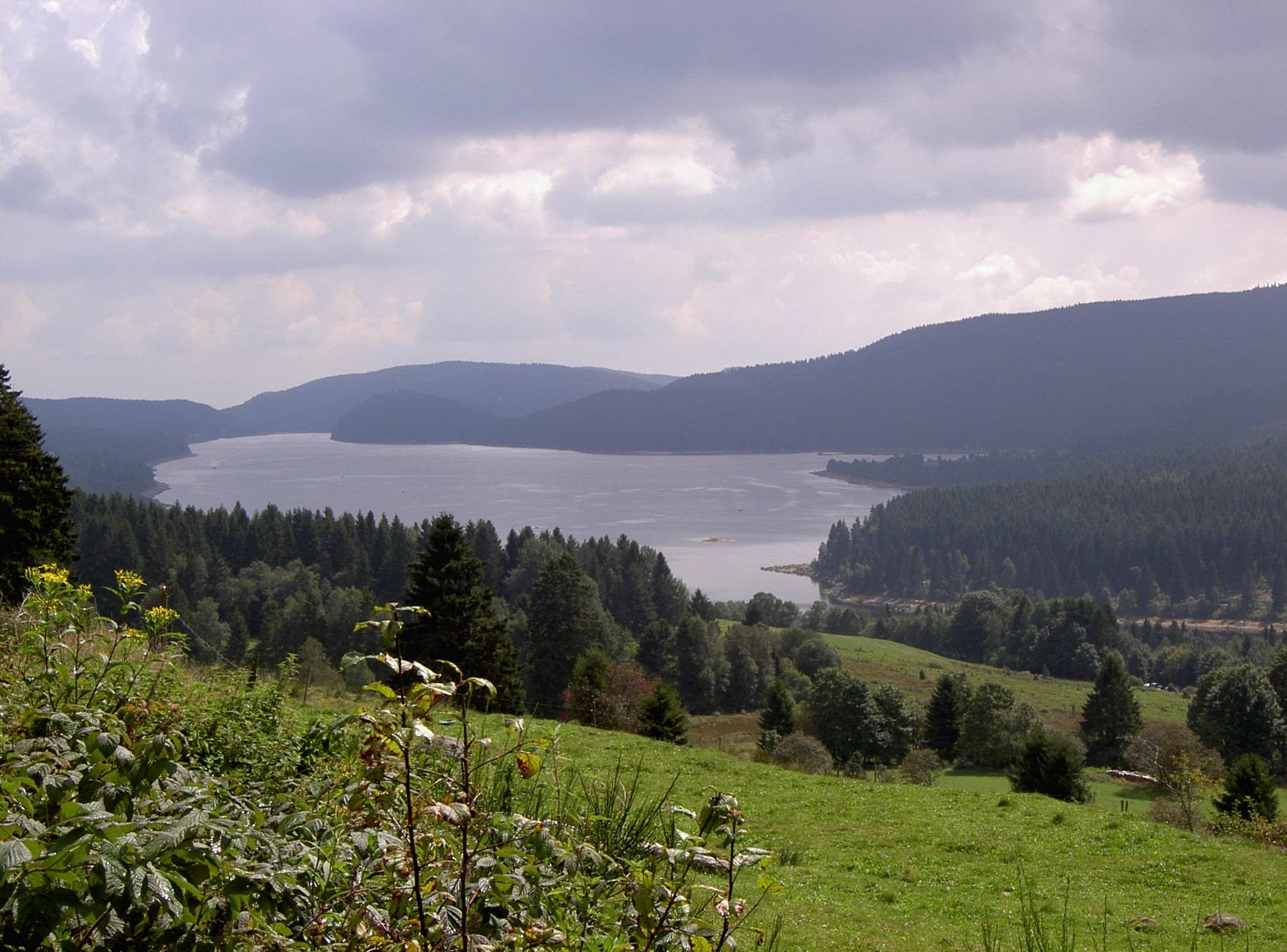
The Schluchsee in the eastern part of the Southern Black Forest

The Southern Black Forest (German: Südschwarzwald, pronounced [ˈzyːtˌʃvaʁtsvalt]) is the highest part of the Black Forest, an area heavily transformed by ice age glaciation south of a line roughly from Freiburg im Breisgau to Donaueschingen. The term High Black Forest is not quite identical; that usually includes the highest part of the Central Black Forest, southeast of the Elz valley, as well. The Southern Black Forest Nature Park (Naturpark Südschwarzwald) also takes in this area, extending across the whole of the High Black Forest as well as several peripheral areas.

== Characteristics ==
Unlike the almost parallel mountain ridges and plateaux of the Northern Black Forest and the deeply incised central region, the Southern Black Forest is dominated by a central area of highland, from which most of the large valley emanate. The highest summits of the central highlands are the Feldberg (1,493 m) and the Herzogenhorn (1,415 m). Towering prominently over the Rhine Plain are the Belchen (1,414 m), the Schauinsland (1,284 m) and the Blauen (1,165 m). Other notable peaks are the Blößling (1,309 m) and the Hochkopf (1,263 m) in the south, and the Hochfirst (1,190 m) in the east. Flowing away from the Feldberg area are the Wiese heading southwest, the Alb southwards, the Schwarza/Schlücht which follows the terrain descending southeast, the Wutach, still called the Seebach and Gutach, initially heading east and the headstreams of the Dreisam dropping steeply northwestwards to the "Black Forest capital" of Freiburg im Breisgau.

West of a line from the Höllental valley to the Wehra Gorge, the relief is characterised by rugged, steep-sided highlands with height differences of between 400 and 1000 metres; to the east is a land of rolling uplands with broad valleys and height differences of between 150 and 400 metres.

Gneiss is the predominant rock with a few granite intrusions. Porphyritic matrices occasionally occur in the rock formations. Unlike the Northern Black Forest, the Bunter sandstone cover with its plateau-like mountain shapes is thinner and has less influence on the relief.

The proportion of forest in the Southern Black Forest is less in comparison with the other two regions.

== Landschaft elements ==
Significant natural monuments:

- Feldberg region with the valley heads of Zastler Loch, Napf (Alpiner Pfad) and Feldseekar
- Seebach valley with the Feldsee and Titisee lakes
- Schluchsee and Windgfällweiher lakes, both artificially enlarged
- Belchen region and the Nonnenmattweiher
- Höllental valley and Ravenna Gorge
- Wutach Gorge
- Alb Gorge
- Wehra Gorge
- Präg Glacial Cirque
- various waterfalls
- Raised bogs like the Hinterzartener Moor, Urseemoor or Scheibenlechtenmoos

Significant settlements and cultural monuments:

- Roman Bath ruins of Aquae villae in Badenweiler
- Freiburg im Breisgau, also called the "capital of the Black Forest"
- Höllental Railway and Three Lakes Railway
- Abbey of Saint Peter in the Black Forest
- St. Trudpert Abbey in the Upper Münster valley
- St. Blasien with its abbey and cathedral
- St. Oswald's Chapel in Höllsteig
- Bürgeln House in the Markgräflerland
- Titisee-Neustadt in the Gutach valley (upper course of the Wutach)
- Todtnau, Schönau and Zell im Wiesental
- Wutach Valley Railway, also called the Sauschwänzlebahn ("Sow's Tail Railway")

== See also ==
- Südschwarzwald Cycleway
