= Roßberg (Black Forest) =

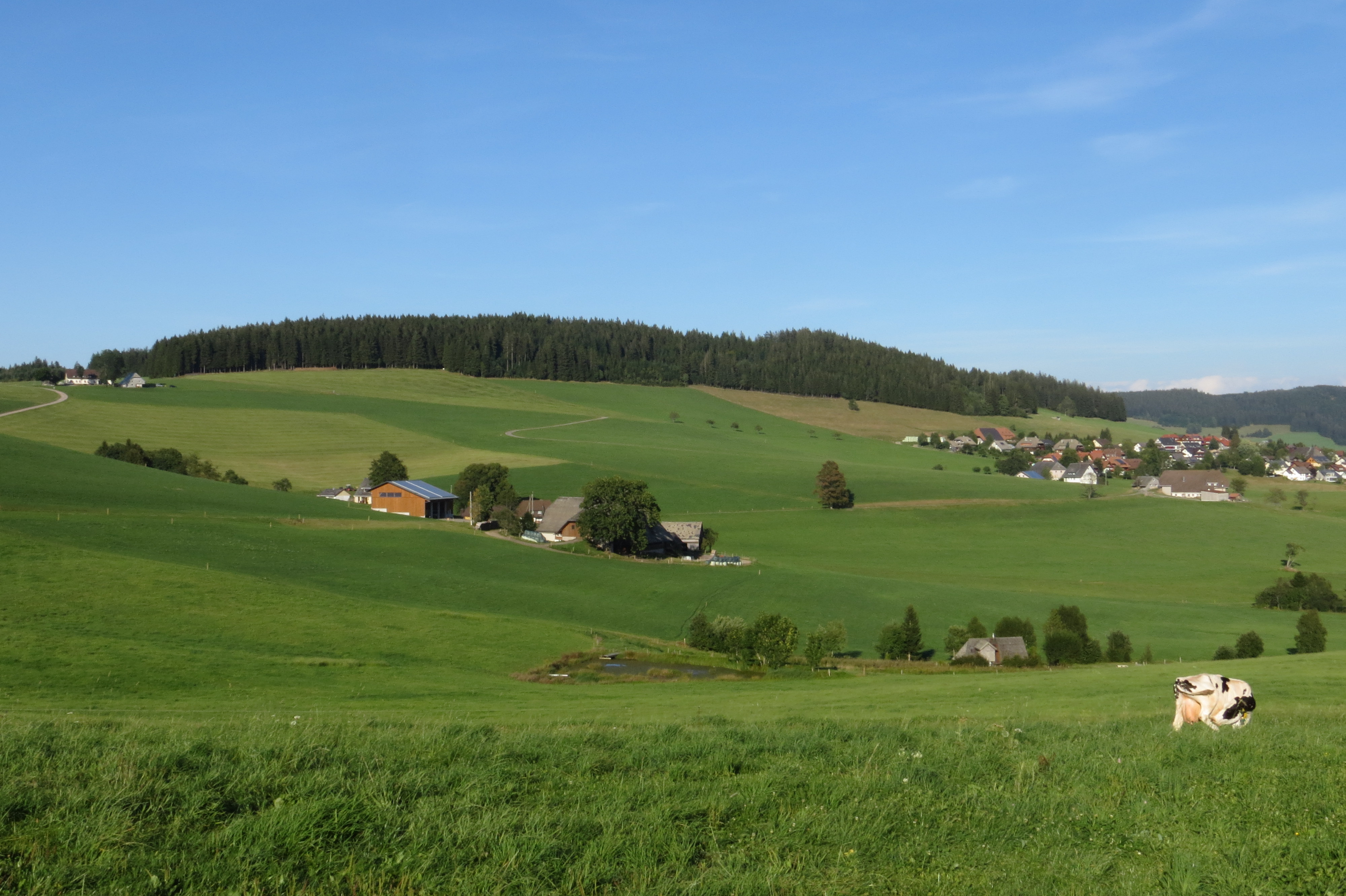
- The Rossberg above the village of Breitnau (r). Seen from Hinterdorf to the southwest.

Highest point
- Elevation: 1,125 m above sea level (NHN) (3,691 ft)
- Coordinates: 47°56′41″N 8°04′42″E

Geography
- Location within Baden-Württemberg
- Location: Breitnau, Baden-Württemberg, Germany
- Parent range: Black Forest

The Roßberg is a mountain, 1,124.7 m above sea level (NHN), in the Black Forest immediately north of Breitnau in the German state of Baden-Württemberg. Hinterzarten, Titisee-Neustadt and St. Märgen are also nearby. On the same ridge just over 1 km to the west is the Hohwart (1123 m) and 2 km to the east, across the Oberbach valley, is the highest mountain in Breitnau municipality: the Weißtannenhöhe (1190 m).

On the northwestern side of the mountain the remains of a rampart and ditch system from the end of the 17th century may be made out. In the area of the Roßberg the fortifications (known as Schanzen) run from the Schanzenhäusle via the Ringelschanze to the zur Roßbergschanze. Between the Ringelschanze and the Roßbergschanze there are continuous, linear structures with several triangular bastions. In 1690 battles were fought at Breitnau, but by the early 18th century the fortifications had lost their military significance.

Immediately next to the Roßbergschanze lies the Breitnau Friends of Nature house (Naturfreundehaus Breitnau, Roßberg 47.951884°N 8.076394°E).

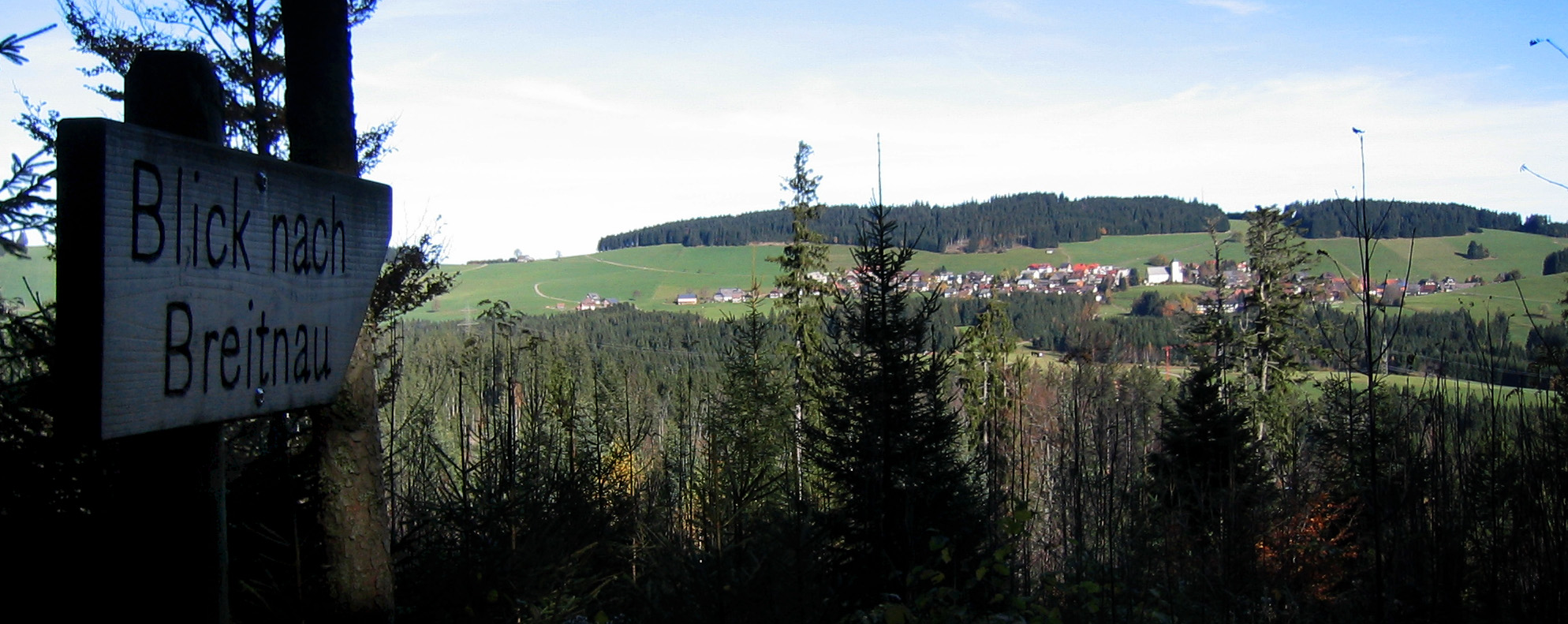
Breitnau with the Roßberg behind
