= Hinterzarten Moor =

Nature reserve in Baden-Württemberg, Germany

- IUCN category IV (habitat/species management area)
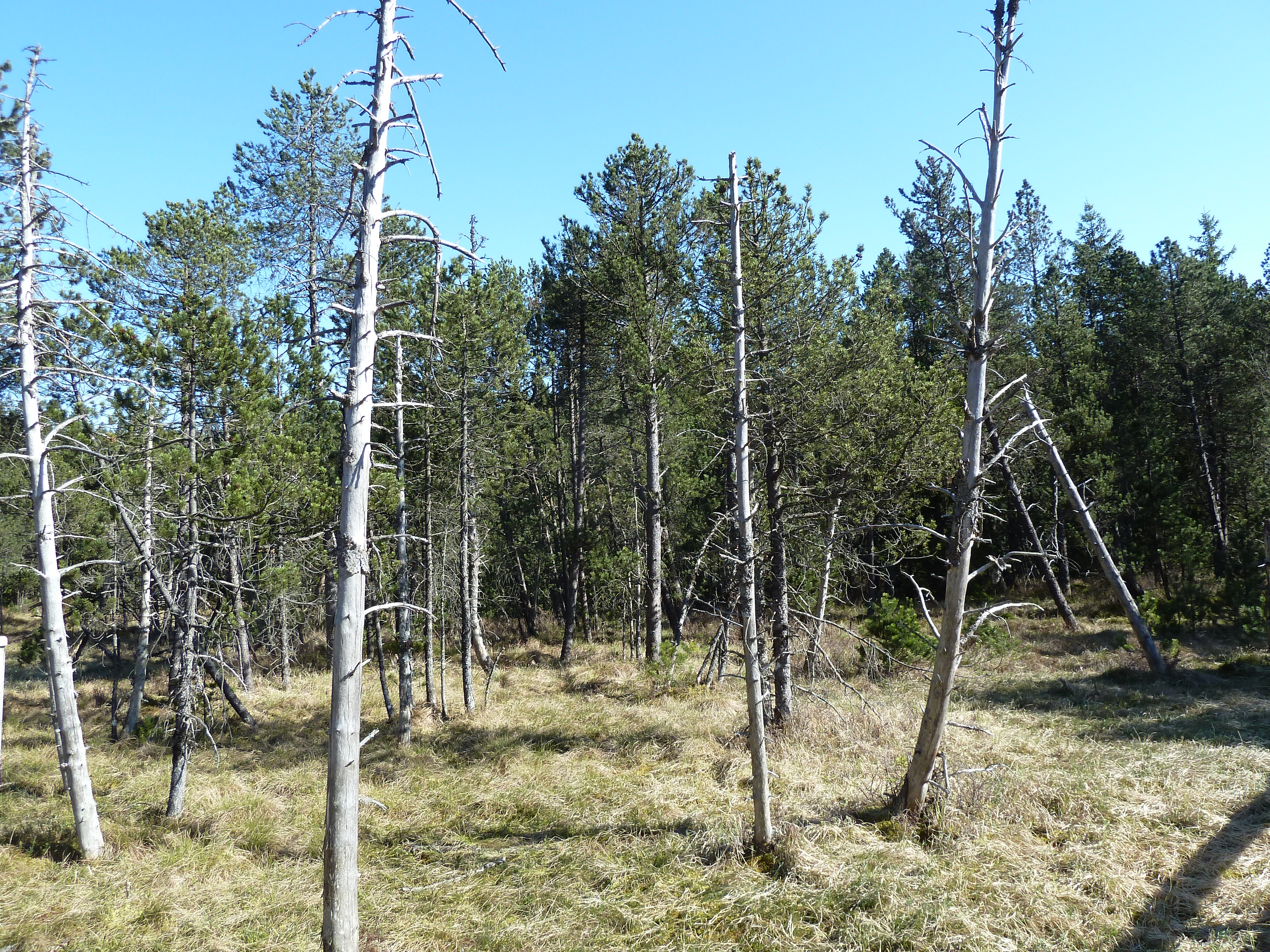

- Location within Baden-Württemberg

- Location in Hinterzarten, Germany
- Location: Hinterzarten, Black Forest, Baden-Württemberg, Germany
- Coordinates: 47°54′24″N 8°7′52″E
- Area: 82.7 ha (204 acres)
- Established: 7 April 1941

The moor of Hinterzarten (Hinterzartener Moor) is a nature reserve located in the municipality of Hinterzarten, Baden-Wuerttemberg, Germany. It is considered the biggest moor in the southern Black Forest.

== Characteristics ==
The nature reserve was firstly designated by the Ministry of Culture and Education in Baden on 7 April 1941 (extended in 1975). The moor covers an area of around 82.7 hectares and it is listed under the reserve number 3.036. The reserve's CDDA code is 81884 and corresponds to the WPDA ID.

== Location and description ==
The reserve is located directly adjacent to the village. It is in the north of Hinterzarten between the Höllental Railway and the German federal highway 31 (B31). It is located in the nature area 115-Southern Black Forest which is within the main nature unit 15-Black Forest. It is part of the Southern Black Forest Nature Park and is largely surrounded by the landscape conservation area no. 3.15.026 Breitnau-Hinterzarten. It is also part of the FFH area 8114-341 Hochschwarzwald um Hinterzarten which holds 1765 hectare.

The moor is located near the highest point of the Höllental Railway which is at the Hinterzarten train station. It drains water both to the west via Zartenbach, Höllenbach, Rotbach and Dreisam to the Upper Rhine north of the Kaiserstuhl at river kilometer 254, and to the east via a stream to the Eisweiher and Titisee, Gutach (Wutach) to the High Rhine near Waldshut-Tiengen, 150 river kilometers up the Rhine.

A stratigraphic line profile based on borehole decections from 1976 showed that the western part of the moor consists of a basin up to 16 meters deep, lying on the moraine of the Feldberg glacier. In its central area, directly beneath the Sphagnum peat layer, there is an underground lake with a diameter of around 300 m and a depth of 3–4 meters. The eastern part of the moor has a peat layer up to 8 meters thick, extending on both sides of the water divide, which elevates to around 890 meters high and separates the former flowing area of the Danube from that of the Rhine.

The western part of the moor is classified as an oligotrophic-acidic to subneutral terrestrialization moor. Moor expert Pascal von Sengbusch has observed signs in the vegetation on the northwestern edge indicating that nutrient-rich water from the southern edge of the moor flows into this area. Thus, the western moor can at least partially be considered a flow-through moor. In contrast, the eastern part of the moor is classified as an ombrogenous raised bog.

In Fall of 2022, the state nature conservation authority installed 13 new informational panels along a 1.8-kilometer-long path. These panels provide information about the moor's formation, its fauna and flora, as well as its history of use. In summer, this educational trail is accessible to strollers and wheelchairs.

== Interventions in the nature reserve ==
In the eastern part of the moor, peat was extracted for several years prior to 1925. For its Hinterzarten peat plant, the former Torfveredelungswerke Germania Aktiengesellschaft Freiburg had built workshops, warehouses, a canteen, office buildings, a steam engine house, as well as a peat press building. These facilities were later dismantled after peat extraction was proven to be uneconomical. The drainage channels constructed for peat extraction caused the moor to begin drying out.

In the southern part of the moor, a sports field was constructed in 1954, and between the 1950s and 1970s, the area was used as a landfill for household, commercial, and bulky waste, as well as soil. During that time car wrecks were also dumped there. Disagreements over the legitimacy of the sports field and the landfill led to a subsequent adjustment of the nature reserve's boundaries. The contaminated area was excluded, and in return, the protected area was expanded to the east. Even after the landfill was closed in 1973, construction waste continued to be dumped on the site until 1980. Today, it is used as a storage site by the town's municipal public works yard. Nutrients still seep from the former landfill into the western part of the moor, harming oligotrophic plant communities. Additionally, as are no adequate buffer zones between the moor, which lies in a depression, and the heavily farmed and fertilized open land to the north exist, nutrients also enter thee moor regularly from that direction.

== Restoration measures ==
In the early 2000s, the first steps toward re-wetting the moor were initiated. As part of the "Moore mit Stern" (Moors with Stars) project (2014–2016), the German nature conservation group NABU carried out additional extensive re-wetting measures to restore and regenerate the eastern part of the moor. A monitoring system was set up, and species surveys were conducted. Selective removal of spruce trees from both the eastern and western parts of the moor took place to encourage the growth of mountain pine trees. The fact that monitoring has since shown consistent peat growth along the ditches is seen as the first success of the restoration efforts.

According to the management plan for the "Hochschwarzwald um Hinterzarten" special area of conservation (SAC), which is relevant for the moor, nutrient input is to be reduced by adopting extensive farming practices and eliminating the use of fertilizers on the meadows to the north. Additionally, a buffer zone is to be created between the former landfill and the seepage water entering the western part of the moor from that direction, in order to further limit nutrient input. The development of a corresponding plan, along with success monitoring, is recommended.

== Conservation goals ==
The primary purpose of protection is to preserve the moorland, which developed from a glacial basin, including its tree population, floating mat, transition bog and high moor with numerous glacial relicts, and a remnant lake.
