= Schule Birklehof =

Birklehof School
- Schule Birklehof
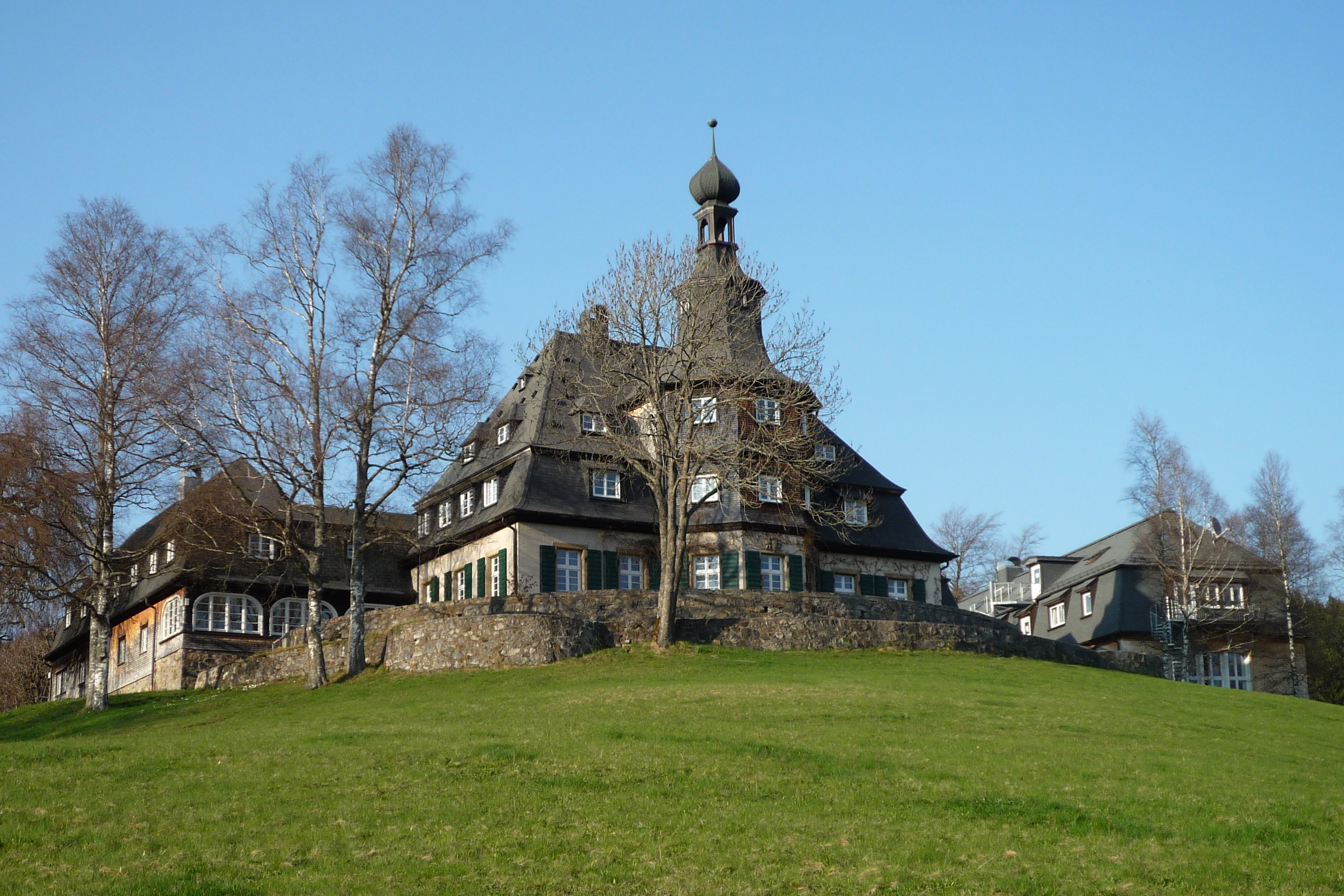
- Main school building (2010)

Location
- Birklehof 1; 79856 Hinterzarten; Germany
- Coordinates: 47°54′46.70″N 08°05′40.05″E

Information
- Type: Private Boarding school and gymnasium
- Established: 1932; 94 years ago
- Founder: Kurt Hahn
- Headmaster: Henrik Fass
- Staff: 35
- Gender: Co-educational
- Age: 11 to 18
- Enrollment: Approx. 230
- Houses: 10 boarding houses
- Website: www.birklehof.de

Birklehof School (German: Schule Birklehof) is a progressive educational boarding school and grammar school with a holistic approach located in Hinterzarten in the High Black Forest in Germany, approximately 25 km from Freiburg. It is a private coeducational secondary school (German: Gymnasium). Currently, the school has approximately 230 students, 170 of whom are boarders who live on campus. The school was established by educator Kurt Hahn in 1932 and from the beginning accepted girls and boys. Under the Nazi regime, Hahn was forced to emigrate to Scotland where he founded Gordonstoun School as well as later Outward Bound, Round Square and the United World Colleges.

== Location ==
The school is in the postal district of Hinterzarten, although much of the building lies on the territory of neighbouring Breitnau. The building Studio 1 lies on the boundary and is thus used occasionally for joint council meetings between the two municipalities which, according to municipal rules, must take place on their own soil.

== Educational philosophy ==
The school stands in the tradition of progressive education reform, or "reform pedagogy" as it is called in Germany. This movement originated in the 1920s. Among other things, Birklehof prides itself in giving students real responsibility in the running of the school. Student representatives have voting rights on all educational matters in general conferences.

== History ==
Birklehof was founded in 1932 by German educator Kurt Hahn. The old Birklehof is a grade-listed farmhouse dating back to 1550. In the early 1920s, a villa was built on the Birklehof estate by a German industrialist. The estate was then given to Hahn for his school. Hahn, after being driven from Germany by the Nazis, went on to found Gordonstoun in Scotland in 1934 and Atlantic College in 1962. It is also a sister school to the more famous Schloss Salem, founded by Hahn in 1920. In 1946, it was reopened by its then head, German philosopher Georg Picht.

== Developments ==
In 2009, the newest building project was completed with the inauguration of the rebuilt Neubirkle boarding house. This state-of-art eco building will be home to 19 boarders and two teachers' families. It also boasts a flat for a boarding house assistant. In the academic year 2010—11, the school will launch a new third middle-school stream. In addition to Foreign Languages or Sciences, students of Years 8 to 10 will be able to choose a musical specialisation. This will include aspects of drama, film making, fine arts and music. It follows an integrated, project-based approach. Furthermore, the school is in the process of switching to 8 instead of 9 years of grammar school, which will be implemented fully in 2012.

== Boarding Houses ==
Birklehof school currently has ten boarding houses. Reflecting its educational philosophy, all houses (with the exception of the Neuer Hirschen West and Neuer Hirschen Ost) have integrated teaching rooms and teachers' flats as well as students' bedrooms. With the exception of the coeducational Unterhaus (Years 5-7) they are all single-sex houses, supervised by a resident houseparent.

- Haupthaus (1923)
- Neubirkle (2009)
- Studio
- Saalbau
- Wolffsburg
- Kopphaus
- Neuer Hirschen West
- Neuer Hirschen Ost
- Petersbau
- Unterhaus
- Altbirkle
- Hahnhaus (2025)

== Notable alumni ==
- Karl Heinz Bohrer, German literary scholar and essayist
- Caio Koch-Weser, politician, economist, former vice president and managing director of the World Bank
- Uwe Nettelbeck, German record producer, journalist and film critic
- Herbert Girardet, author, visiting professor at various universities in England, program director of the World Future Council
- Ernst Ulrich von Weizsäcker, German scientist and politician
- Gabrielle Donnay, German-born American mineralogist

== Literature ==
- Teresa Löwe: Georg Picht und die Schule Birklehof in der Nachkriegszeit (1946–1955) (PDF-Datei; 170 kB), Berlin 2004
- Karl Heinz Bohrer: Granatsplitter - Erzählung einer Jugend, dtb, München 2014, S. 137ff
- Stefan Würthle (MA thesis Freiburg, 2nd. edition 1998) Der Birklehof - Ein deutsches Landerziehungsheim in nationalsozialistischer Zeit.
