= Die Fallers – Die SWR Schwarzwaldserie =

- Country of origin: Germany
- Original language: German
- No. of seasons: 31
- No. of episodes: 1300+

Production
- Running time: 30 minutes

Original release
- Network: SWR Fernsehen
- Release: 25 September 1994 – present

Die Fallers – Die SWR Schwarzwaldserie (until 2011: "Die Fallers – Eine Schwarzwaldfamilie") is a German television series produced by the Südwestrundfunk about the life of a fictional family on a farm in the Black Forest. Its current timeslot on SWR Fernsehen is Sundays at 19:15.

It features, among others, the Black Forest resident and actor, Martin Wangler who has been with the show since 2007.

== See also ==
- List of German television series
