= St. Oswald's Chapel (Höllental) =

Coordinates: 47°55′03″N 8°04′09″E

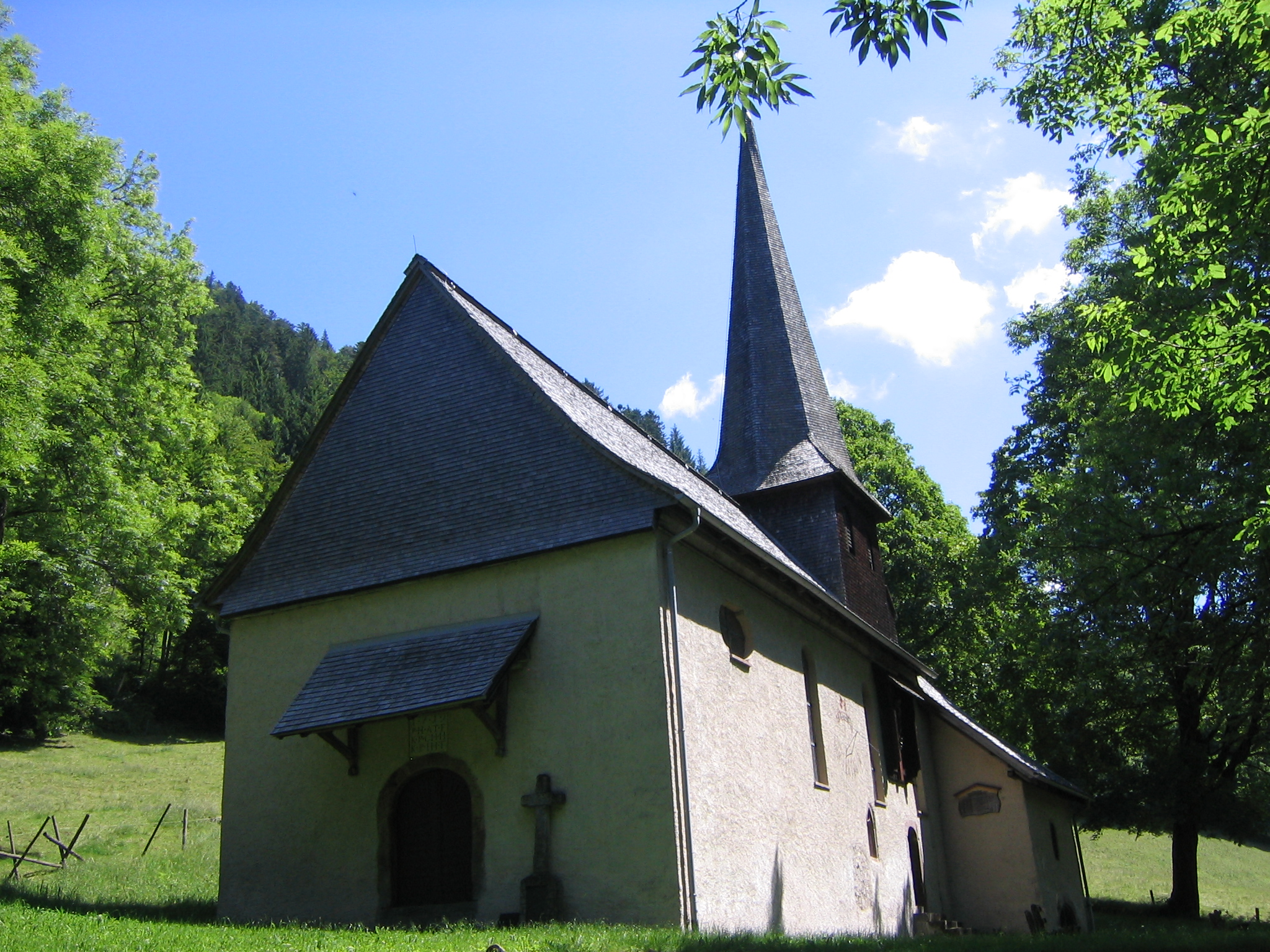
St. Oswald’s Chapel

St. Oswald’s Chapel (German: St. Oswald-Kapelle) lies in the Höllental in the High Black Forest, at its eastern end near the Ravenna Bridge. Administratively it lies in the civil parish of Steig in the municipality of Breitnau in the county of Breisgau-Hochschwarzwald in the German state of Baden-Württemberg. Ecclesiastically it belongs to the parish of Hinterzarten. The chapel is dedicated to Oswald of Northumbria, a 7th-century Anglo-Saxon king. He is depicted in several places on the main altar of the chapel.

== History ==
The chapel was consecrated in 1148 by Bishop Hermann I of Konstanz as a proprietary church of the lords of Falkenstein (after their castle in the Höllental valley. According to the first detailed investigation by Ekkehard Liehl (1911–2003) it was the seedcorn of settlements in the region, the mother church of Hinterzarten and Breitnau and the oldest surviving parish church in the High Black Forest. Today it is also suspected, however that the settlement had been established on the upland and that there had been a parish church in Breitnau before St. Oswald was founded. From the 13th century onwards, St. Oswald became a chapel of the church at Breitnau. This changed when, in 1416, Hinterzarten 1416 was given its own church, the present parish church of Maria im Zarten. Since then, St. Oswald has been ecclesiastically part of Hinterzarten. Attempts to abandon the "old dive" (alte Spelunke) or "most superfluous of all chapels" (entbehrlichste unter allen Kapellen), were ended in 1812 by the grand ducal government in Karlsruhe.

The chapel holds up to 250 people and is used for weddings, patron saint festivals and at Christmas (by the Hofgut Sternen). In addition, since 2012 during the summer months there is a fair here once a month around midday.

== Building ==
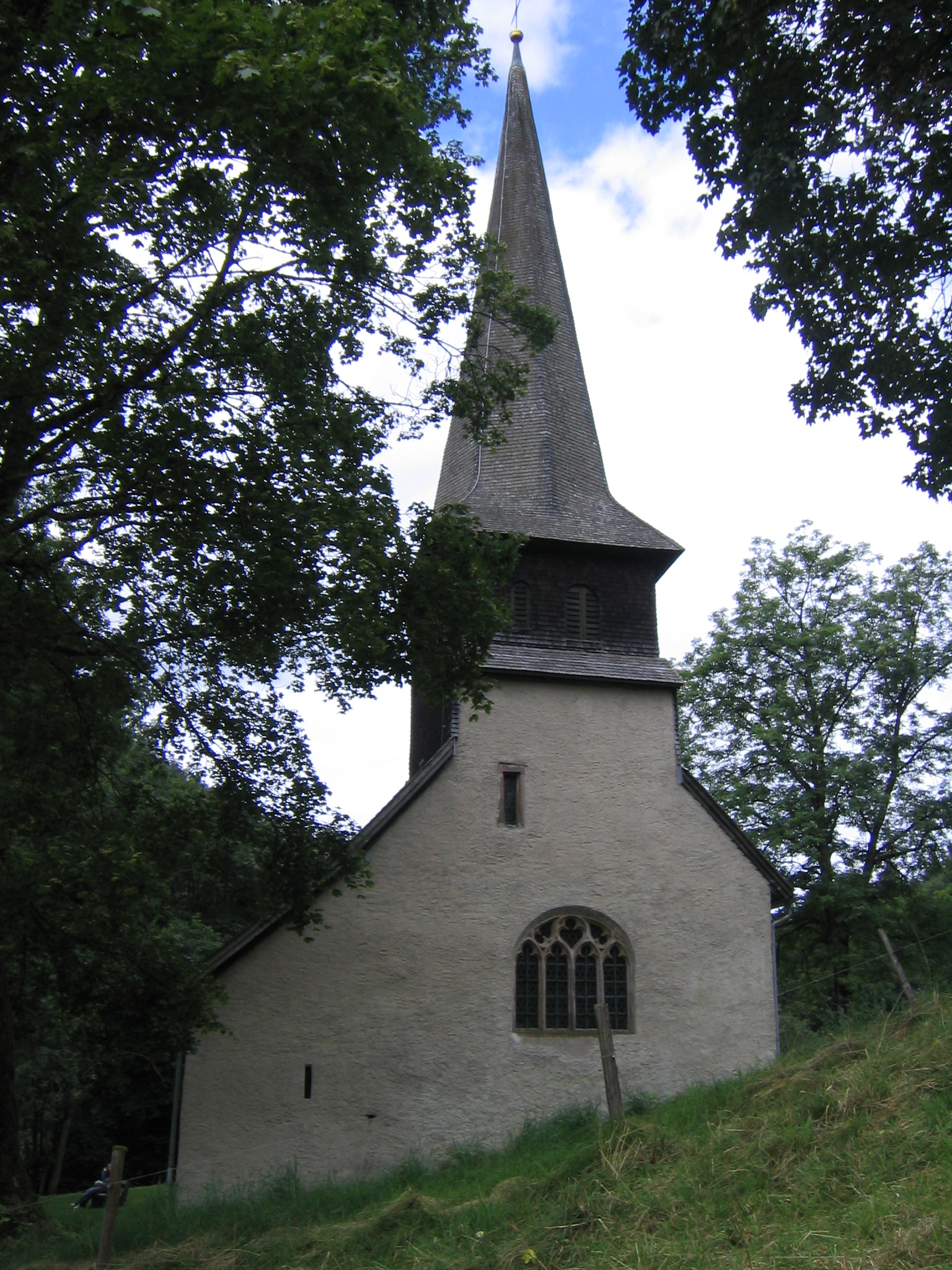
16th century: view from the east of the choir and tracery window

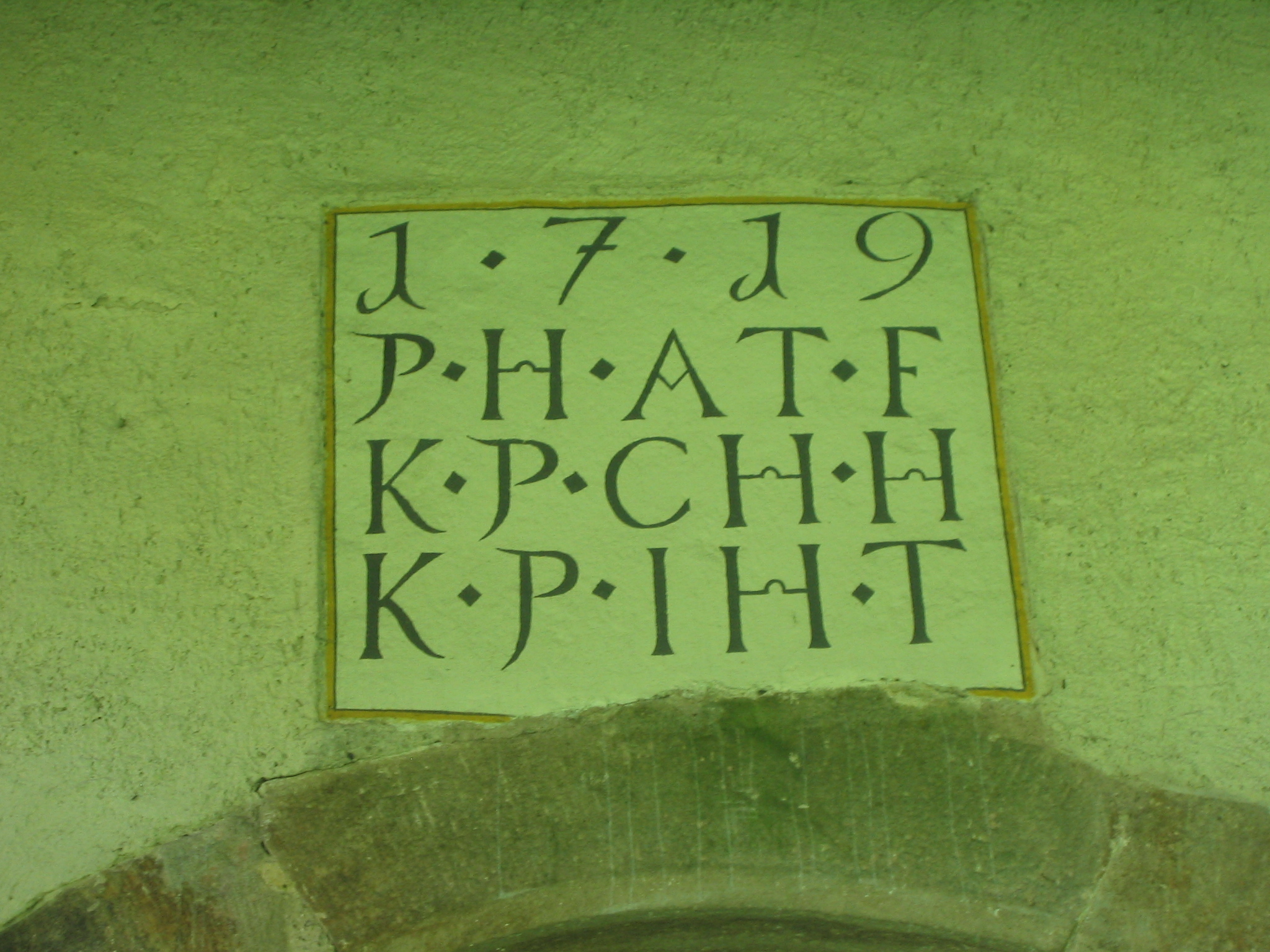
1719 extension

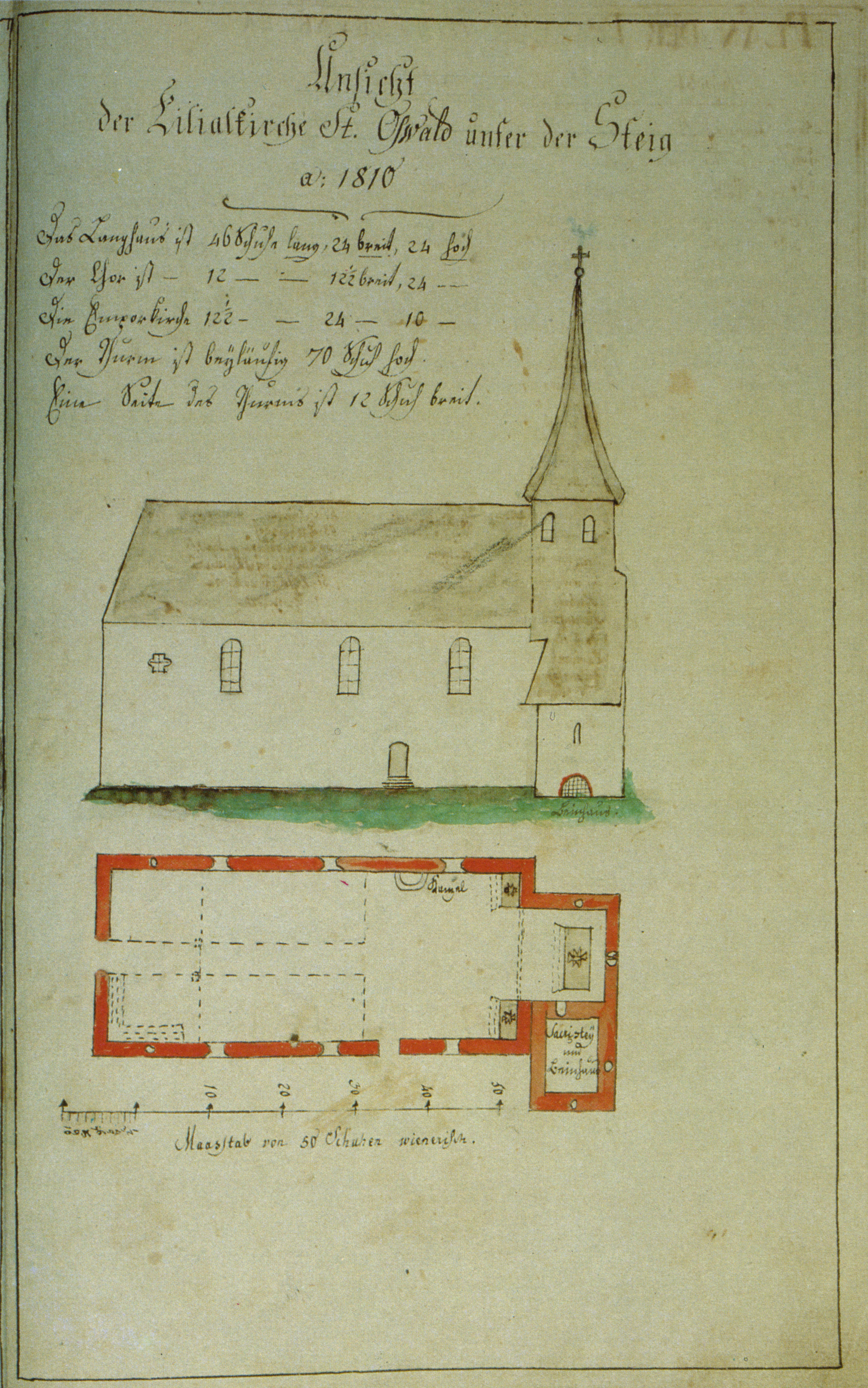
In 1810; so largely similar to today

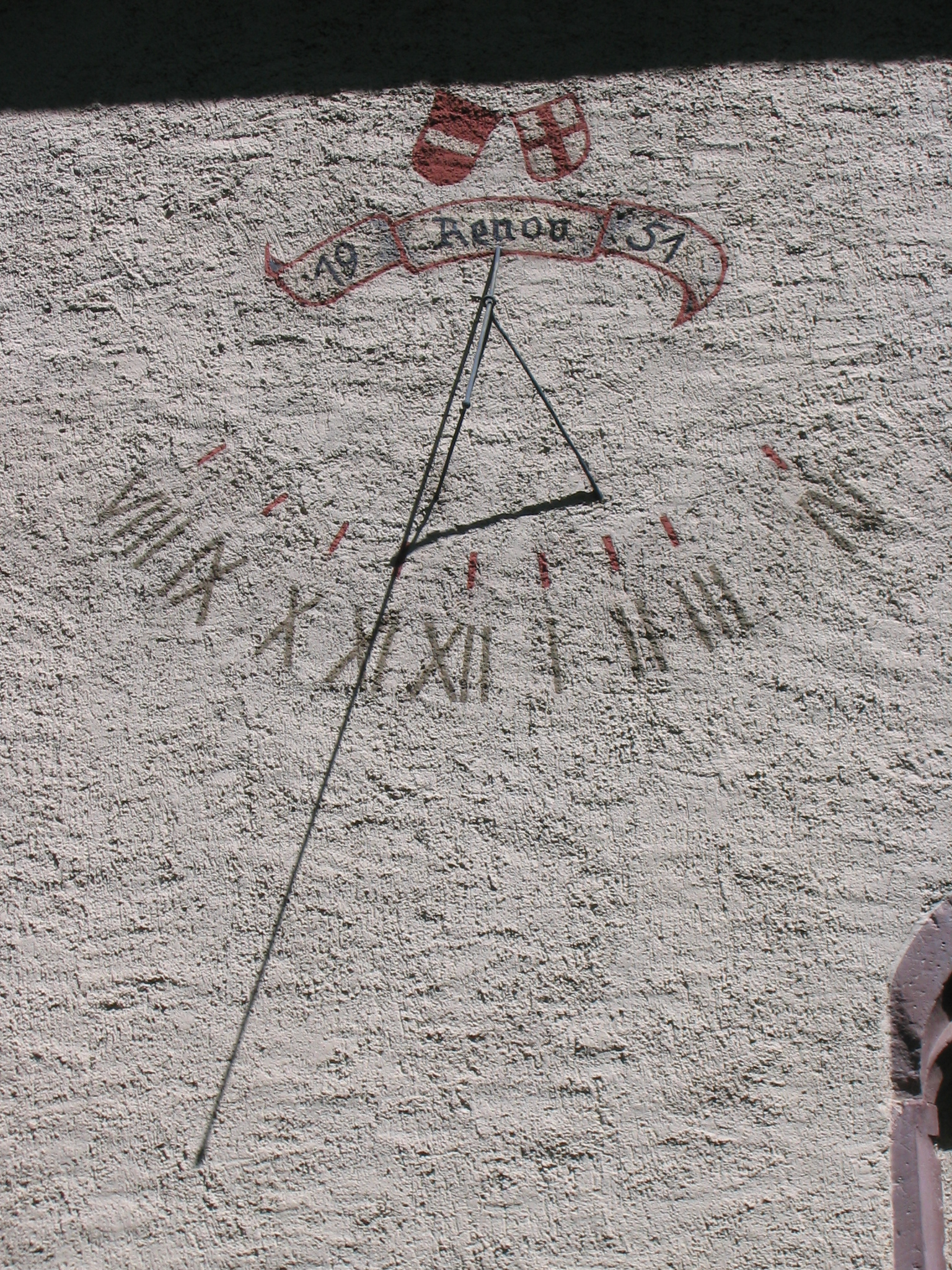
Sundial with the year 1951

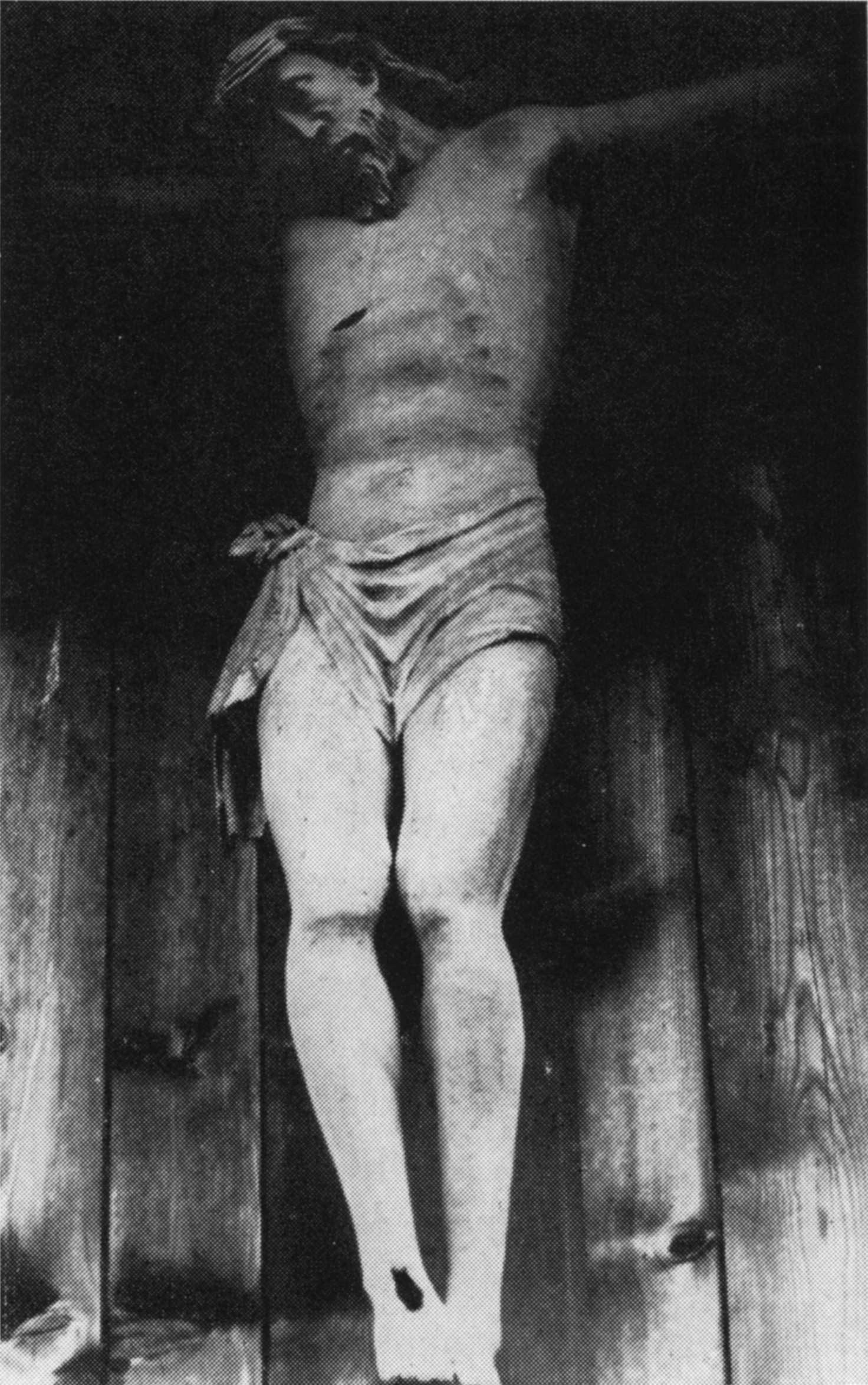
The lost cross of Georg Hauser

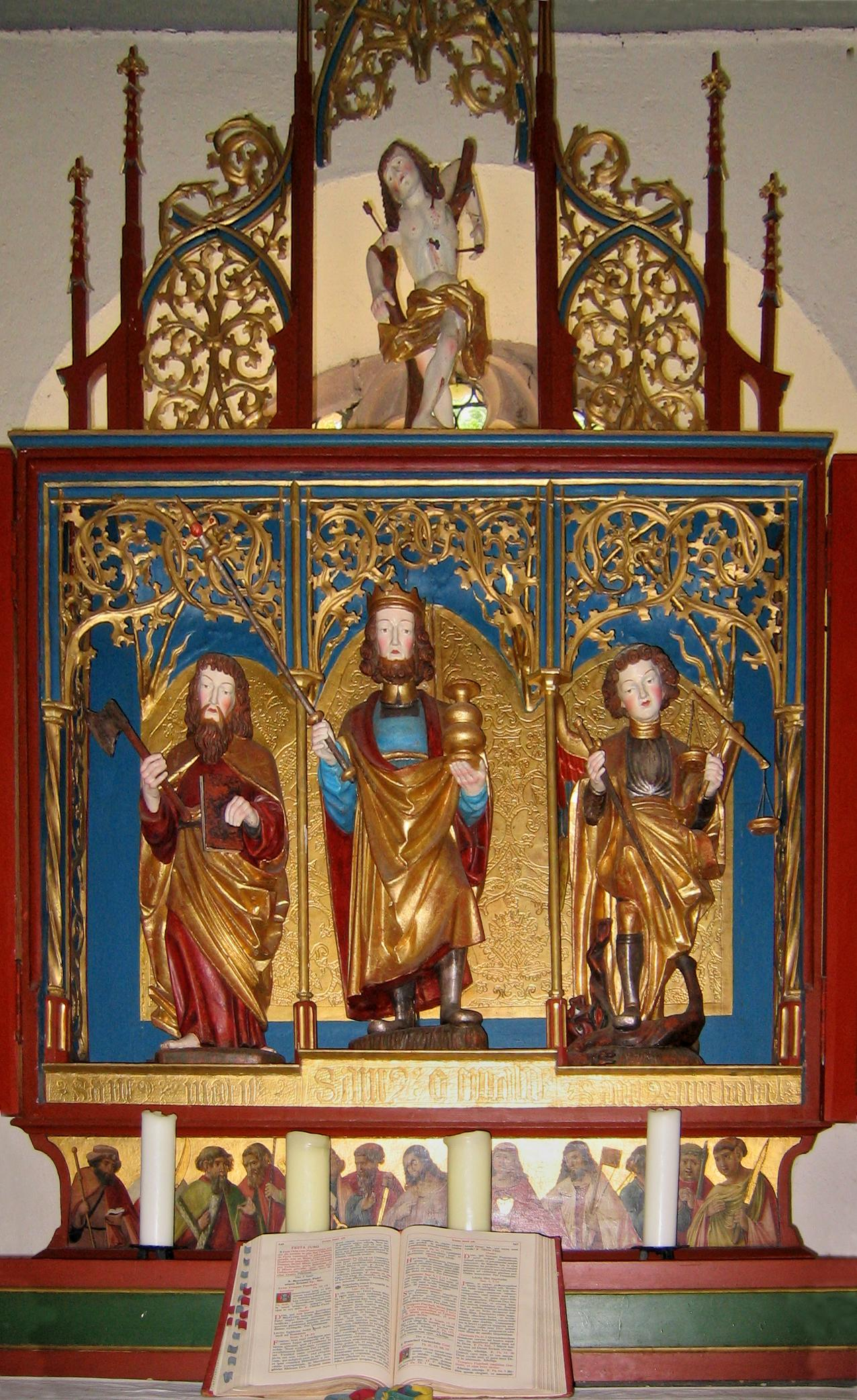
Part of the winged altar

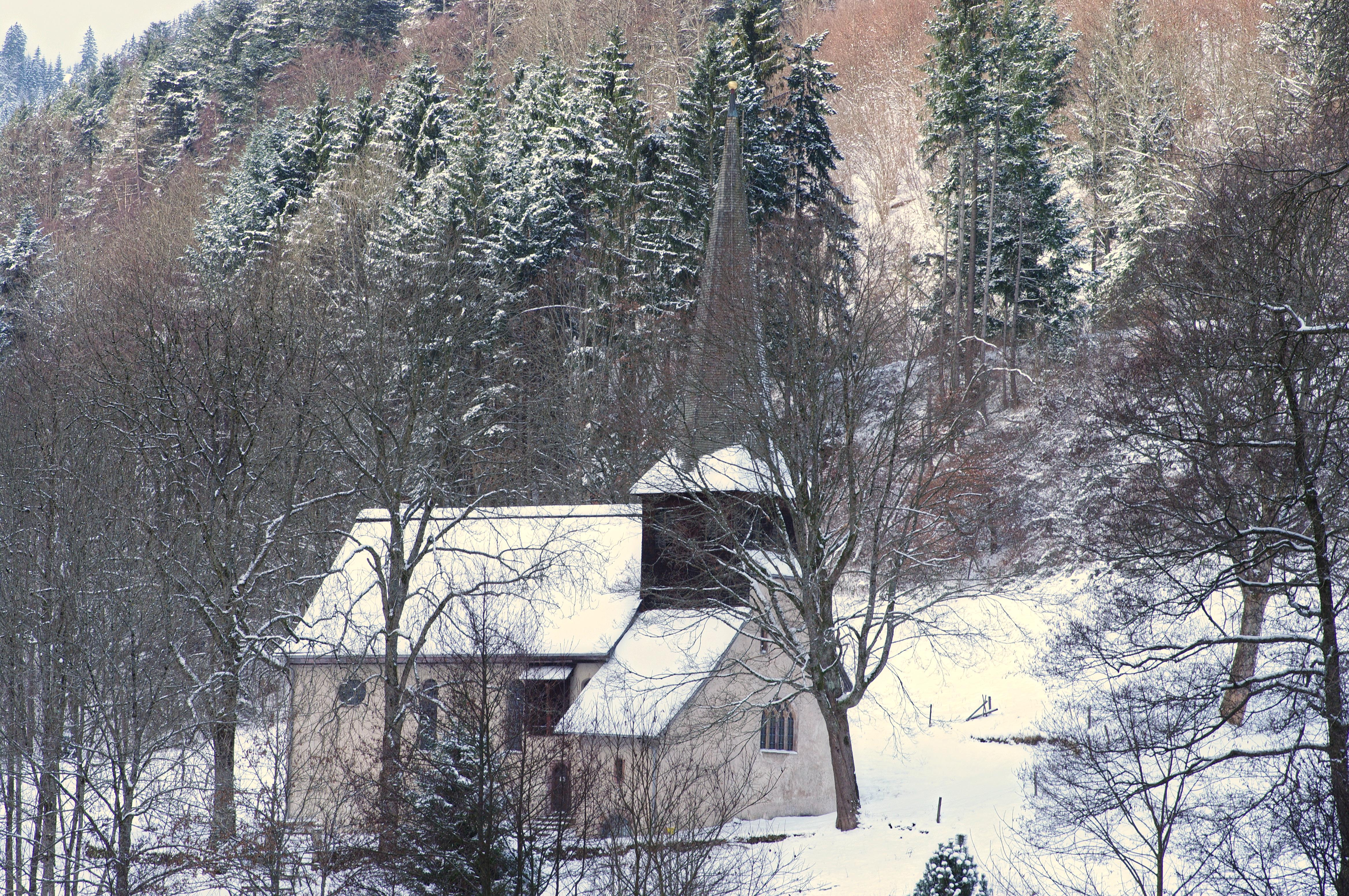
St. Oswald in winter

The small rectangular choir space with its altar stone and the two stones of the side altar date to the Romanesque building consecrated in 1148, as does the eastern half of the south wall in which the herringbone work was executed. In the early 13th century a groin vaulted sacristy and an ossuary were added which may be looked into from the south side. The lintel above the sacristy door has the date 1208 carved in it in Arabic numbers. In the mid-14th century, the choir was extended to the north and, in the early 16th century, when the Oswald altar was brought into the church (see below), the four-panel tracery window was let into the east wall of the choir. Around 1674 the wooden tower was erected and around 1719 the building was extended to the west and north. In 1719 the walls were also raised and the nave was given a gallery supported on wooden columns. Above the west entrance under the date “1719” are 3 rows of capital letters that commemorate the patron of the extension. In the Second World War the chapel was damaged; the war damage was repaired in 1951/1952. On the south side of the nave is the sundial and, in a painted ‘’banderole’’ is the inscription “19 – Renov – 51”. On 7 June 1980, after the chapel had been burgled for the second time, a choir screen was fitted. The figures now in the church are copies, as indicated by a plaque in the choir room. This includes a copy of the crucifix on the north side of the nave, which had been carved in 1617 by Georg Hauser (died around 1653) from the eponymous woodcarving guild. In 1980 the chapel was also renovated.

== St. Oswald's Altar ==
The chapel is also noteworthy for its retable that dates to the period around 1515. Long largely ignored, in 1998 it was ascribed by art historian, Andreas Curtius, to studio colleagues of artist, Hans Baldung Grien, and woodcarver, Hans Wydyz, who were both working in Freiburg at the time. It is a winged altar. The folding wings depict, on their exterior side, Saint Matthias and Saint Oswald (left) as well as Saint Sebastian and Saint Michael with the scales for weighing souls (right), each standing in front of a country scene. When opened the paintings on the panels depict, on the left, the Adoration of the Magi, and, on the right, the Visitation of Mary (to Elizabeth). The scenes on the inside are embedded in landscapes and have a gold field. In the centre, in the original shrine, stand three round statues, again Saint Matthias, Saint Oswald and Saint Michael with his scales (copies, the originals are in the church in Hinterzarten). Above them, also in its original superstructure stands a statue of Saint Sebastian (also a copy). The four sculptures thus echo the paintings of saints on the outside of the altar wings. The painted predella (pedestal step) shows the twelve apostles. Stylistically the panels show influences of Albrecht Dürer, Lucas Cranach and the Danube School. Curtius judges that: "the high altar of Saint Oswald's Chapel in Steig in the Höllental valley is the only surviving Late Gothic polyptych with painted panels in the High Black Forest. It is one of the most important surviving examples in the region of the Upper Rhine School in the early sixteenth century."
