= Wangler =

Person who resorts to trickery or devious methods to obtain their goals

A wangler is one who resorts to trickery or devious methods to obtain their goals. One might find himself classified as a wangler if they were to manipulate information to obtain a job.

== Etymology ==
The term has been historically attributed to a British printer's slang term meaning "fake by manipulation" in 1888. Wangle may be an alteration of waggle or the dialectic wankle meaning "unsteady or fickle", which descends from the Old English wancol. If this is true, wangle would share an etymological heritage with the modern word wench.
