= Hohwart =

Mountain in Baden-Württemberg, Germany

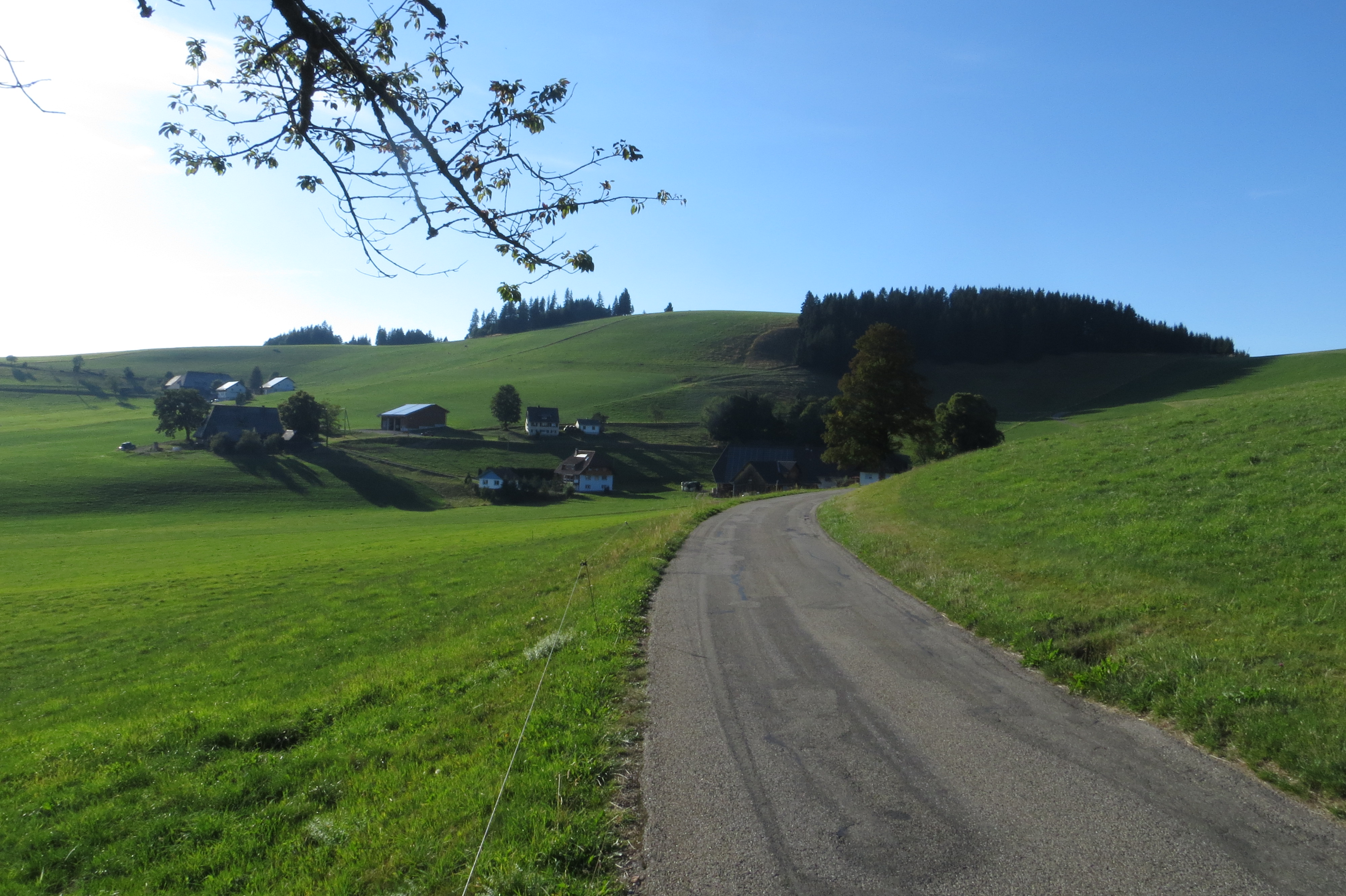
- The Hohwart from the Vogtjockeleshof to the southeast.

Highest point
- Elevation: 1,123 m above sea level (NHN) (3,684 ft)
- Prominence: 46 m (151 ft)Schaenzenhausle
- Coordinates: 47°56′40.49″N 8°3′36.68″E

Geography
- Location within Baden-Württemberg
- Location: Breitnau, Baden-Württemberg, Germany
- Parent range: Black Forest

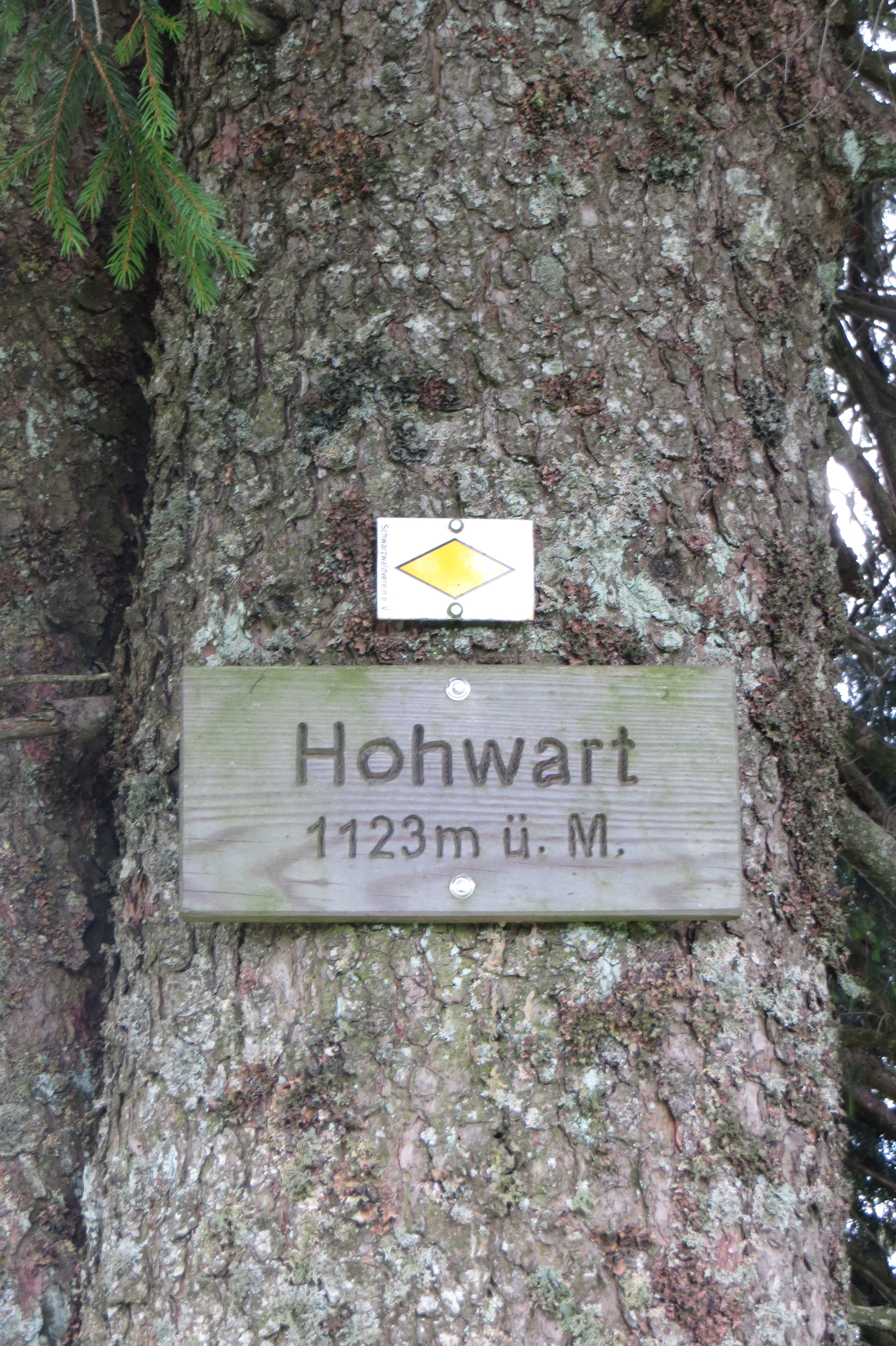
Sign marking the summit of the Hohwart

The Hohwart (occasionally also Hohwarthöhe or Hohwart-Höhe) is a mountain near the village of Breitnau in the Black Forest in the German state of Baden-Württemberg. It is 1,123 metres high.

== Wind generator ==
On 26 May 1992 a wind generator was built on the Hohwart Saddle, not far from the summit of the Hohwart. It was one of the first wind turbines in Baden-Württemberg. It is an Enercon type E-32/E-33 with a 3-blade rotor and a hub height of 33.5 m.

== Schanze on the Hohwart ==
On the Hohwart is a schanze. It was part of the baroque fortifications in the Black Forest. It was a square schanze in which there were log cabins. The schanze on the Hohwart was not linked by a bank-and-ditch system to its neighbouring schanzes, the Schanze auf dem Haldenbuck and the Ringelschanze on the Roßberg.
