= Breitnau =

- Municipality
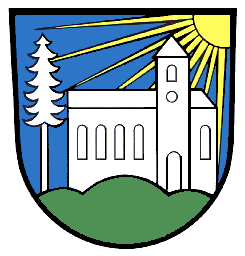
- Coat of arms

- Location of Breitnau within Breisgau-Hochschwarzwald district
- Interactive map of Breitnau
- Location within Germany Location within Baden-Württemberg
- Coordinates: 47°56′21″N 8°4′45″E
- Country: Germany
- State: Baden-Württemberg
- Admin. region: Freiburg
- District: Breisgau-Hochschwarzwald

Government
  - Mayor (2024–32): Markus Kleiser

Area
  - Total: 39.9 km^{2} (15.4 sq mi)
- Elevation: 1,018 m (3,340 ft)

Population (2025-12-31)
  - Total: 1,894
  - Density: 47.5/km^{2} (123/sq mi)
- Time zone: UTC+01:00 (CET)
  - Summer (DST): UTC+02:00 (CEST)
- Postal codes: 79874
- Dialling codes: 07652
- Vehicle registration: FR
- Website: www.breitnau.de

Breitnau (German pronunciation: [ˈbʁaɪtnaʊ]) is a municipality in the district of Breisgau-Hochschwarzwald in Baden-Württemberg in southern Germany, about 30 kilometres from the city of Freiburg im Breisgau. It is located within the High Black Forest.

== Geography ==
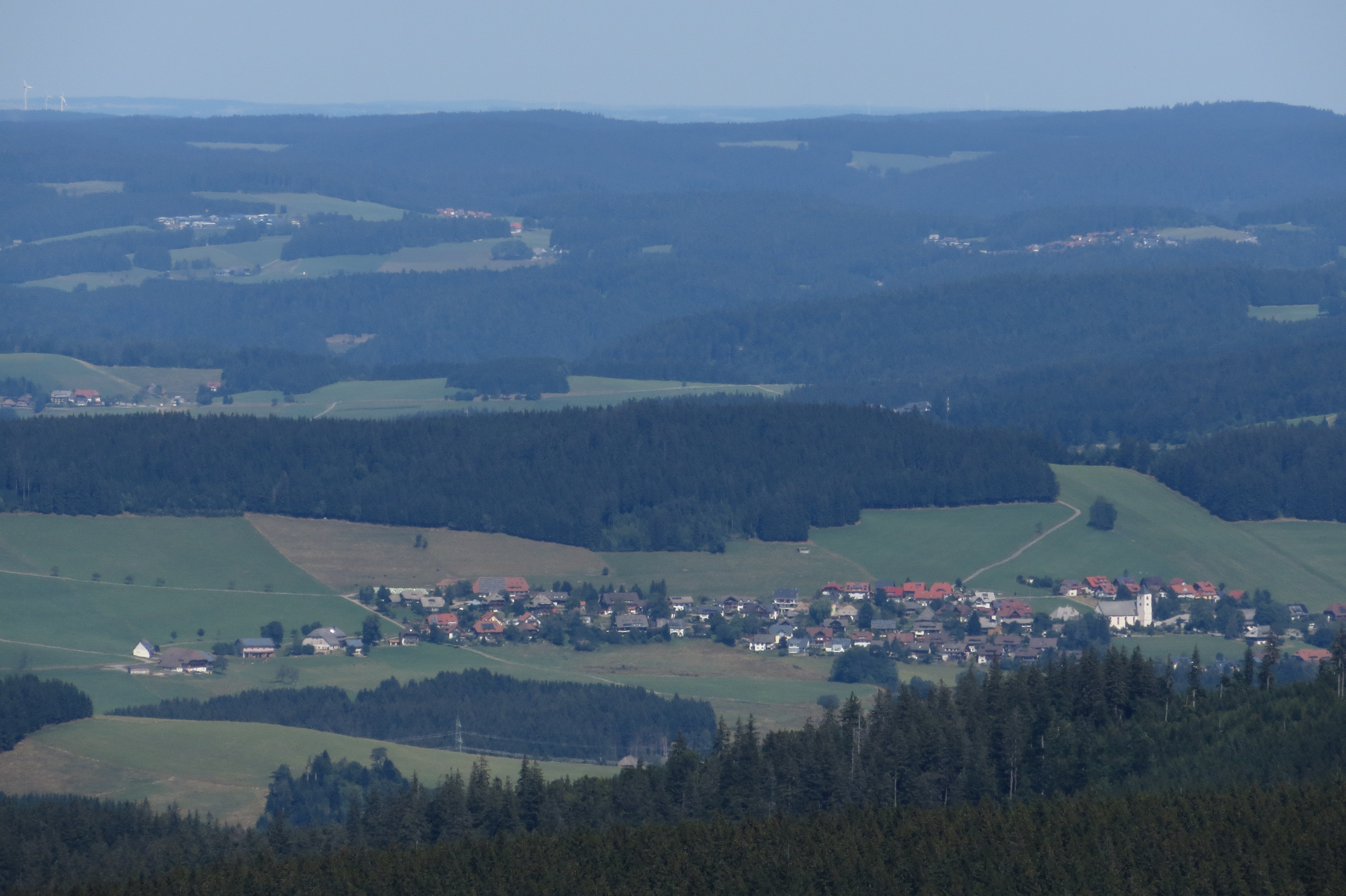
Breitnau seen from the summit of the Feldberg

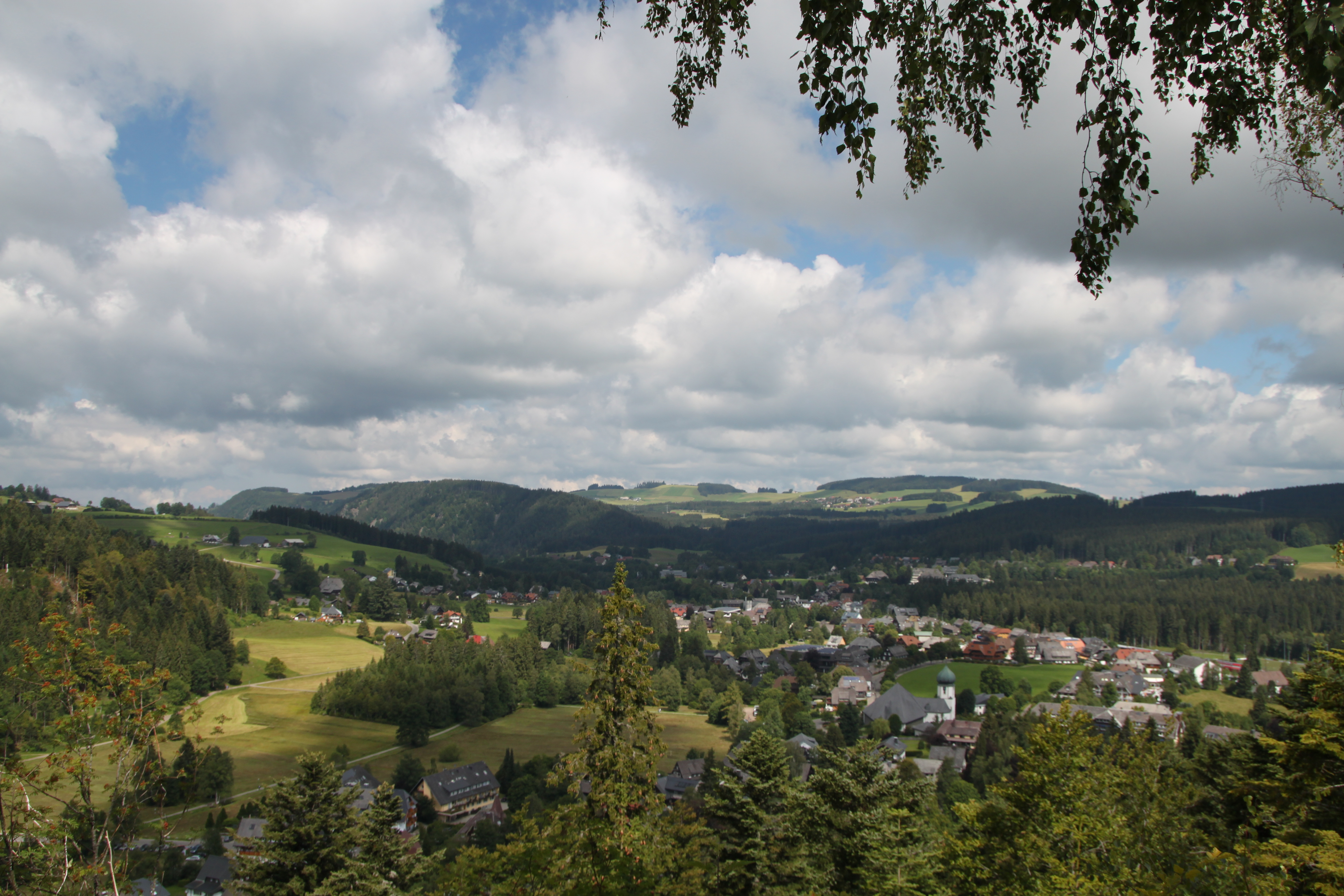
View over the Hinterzarten Plateau of the Breitnau Bowl and the valley of the Höllental (left)

The municipality of Breitnau is very spread out, with many, scattered, farmsteads, some of the very large, most of which have farmhouses with half-hipped roofs, typical of the Black Forest. The actual village centre is comparatively small, but has grown in recent years. The highest mountain is the Weißtannenhöhe ("Silver Fir Height") which is 1,190 metres high. North of the village rises the Roßberg (1,125 m) and about 1 km to the northwest of the village on the same ridge is the Hohwart (1,123 m).

=== Municipal subdivisions ===
The municipality of Breitnau incorporates the villages of Hinterdorf, Steig (since 1935 part of Breitnau) and Vorderdorf, the Zinken Beim Löwen, Bisten (partly also in Hinterzarten), Bruckbach, Eckbach, Einsiedel, Fahrenberg, Freyel, Hintereck, Hirschsprung, Höllsteig, Hohlengraben, Jungholz-Föhrwald, Löffeltal, Moos, Oberhöllsteig, Ödenbach, Posthalde, Ravenna(schlucht), Siedelbach (since 1860 part of Breitnau), Tiefen, Winterhalden and Wirbstein, the farms of Haberstrohhof, Holzhof, Kuhnenbach, Schuhmächerlehof and Zimmeracker and the houses of Bäuerleshütte, Birklehof, Eckerhäusle, Falkenfreyel, Hundsschachen, Jockelhäusle, Jörgenhäusle, Nessellachen and Paulyhäusle. Within the municipality lies the ruined Falkenstein Castle.

== History ==
Breitnau is first mentioned 1275 as Breittnowe but is probably older as the first church was built around 1200 and St. Oswald's Chapel was consecrated as early as 1148. At that time the land was owned by the lords of Falkenstein but was sold in 1408 to the Schnewlins of Landeck. In the early 16th century the territory went to the lords of Sickingen.

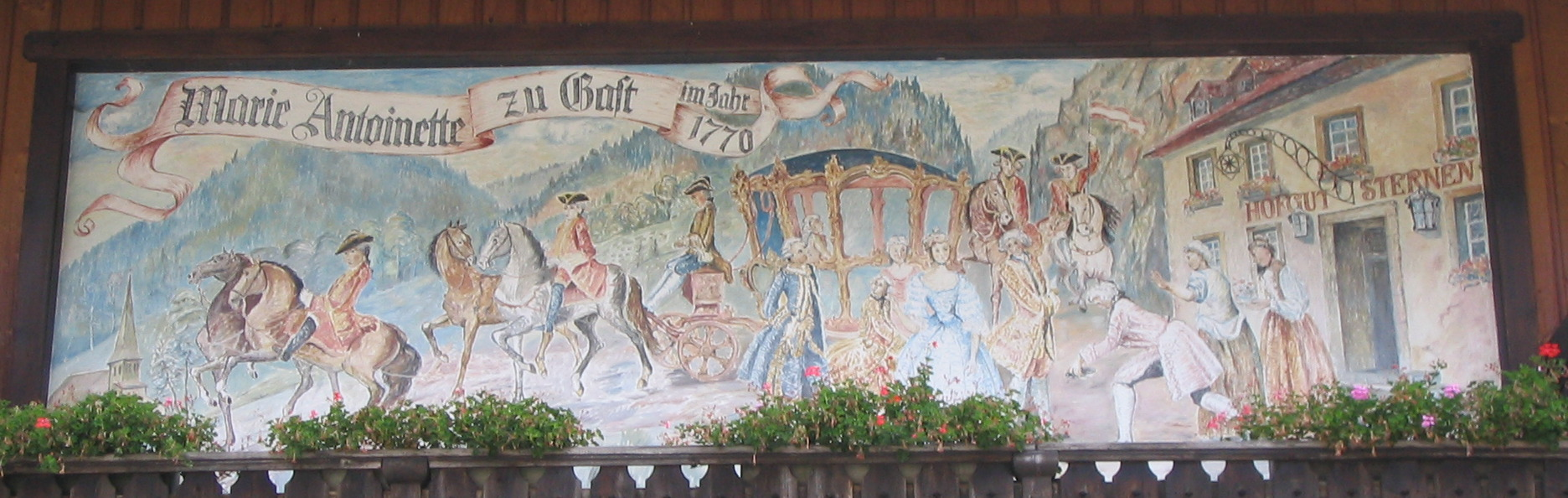
Painting at Hofgut Sternen: Stay by Marie Antoinette in 1770

In 1688 the Margrave Louis William of Baden had schanzen built which were intended to block any invasion by the French. But the defences were constructed in vain because the French attacked the village two years later and razed the vicarage and several farms. In 1755, the poor route through the Höllental was improved in order to enable the bridal procession of Princess Marie Antoinette to travel as much as possible on Anterior Austrian soil on her way to Paris. In 1806, the lords of Sickingen sold Breitnau to the newly established Grand Duchy of Baden.

=== Religion ===
There has been a church in the village since about 1200. The present Roman Catholic parish church is dedicated to St. John the Baptist and dates to 1753. The nearest Protestant church is the Evangelical Church of St. James in Hinterzarten.

== Politics ==
The municipal council consists of ten members, who were re-elected on 25 May 2015 with 61.7% of the vote. List A received 42.4% (4 seats) and List B 57.6% (6 seats). The council comprises 4 women and 6 men.

Until 31 Aug 2009, the chairman was Wolfgang Schlachter. On 5 July 2009, Josef Haberstroh was elected as the new chairman and took office on 1 September 2009.

Breitnau and its southern neighbour, Hinterzarten, form a joint administrative municipality (Vereinbarte Verwaltungsgemeinschaft) and tourist community. However, each parish has its own primary school, the Carl Ludwig Magon School in Breitnau and the Georg Thoma School in Hinterzarten.

== Economy and infrastructure ==
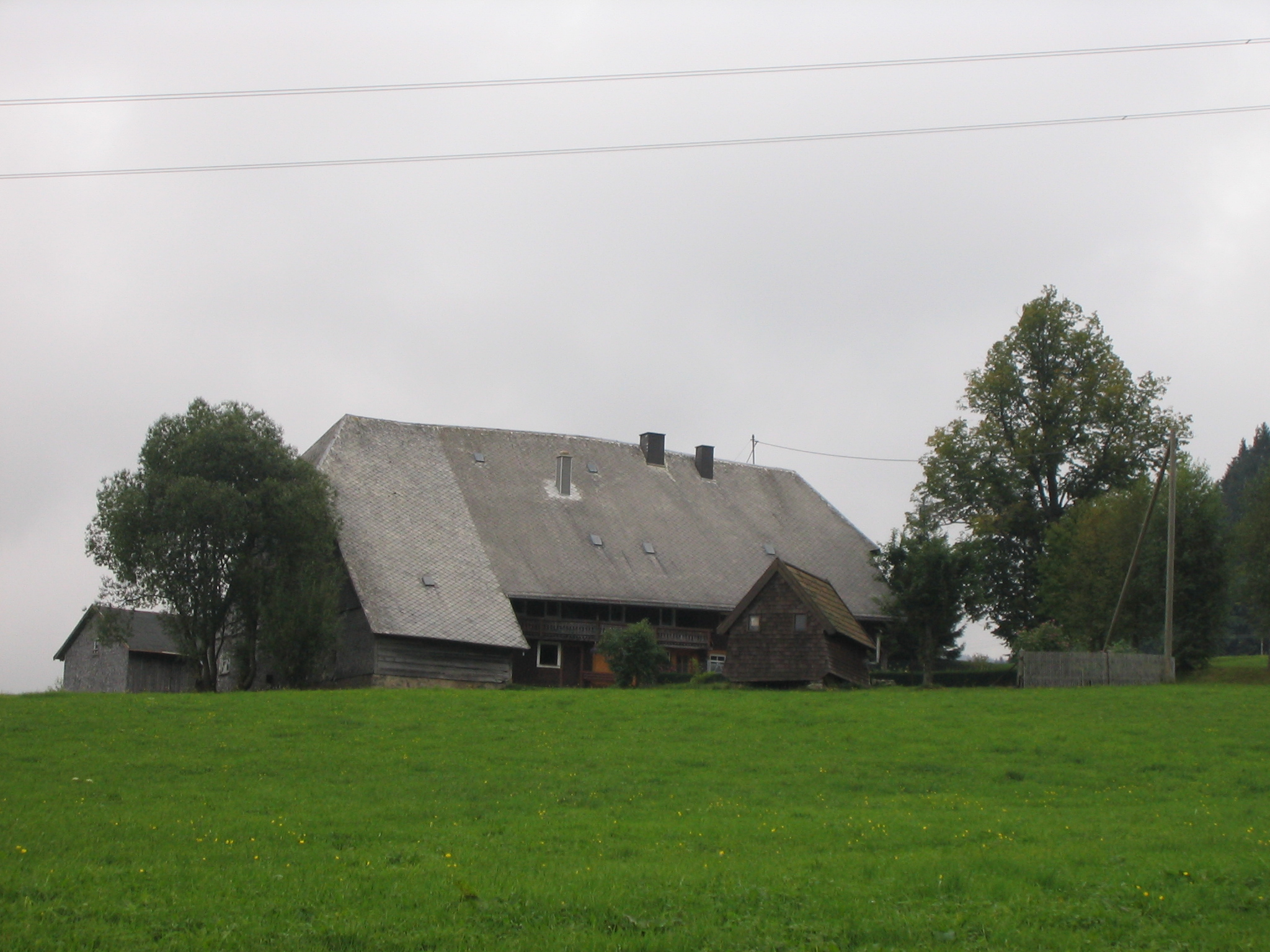
Farmhouse on the edge of Breitnau

Breitnau's economy is predominantly governed by the forestry industry and pastoral farming. In addition, tourism plays a rather small role near the B 50 federal highway. In summer, Breitnau is suitable for walking. If the weather is clear, there are views over the Upper Rhine Plain and to the Vosges beyond. Although the terrain is a high plateau over much of the area, there are steep trails down into the Höllental valley or through the Ravenna Gorge. In winter Breitnau is used for cross country skiing; in particular there is a loipe, the Thurnerspur, and a link to the cross country trail from Schonach to Hinterzarten. Three small ski lifts are used for local downhill skiing.

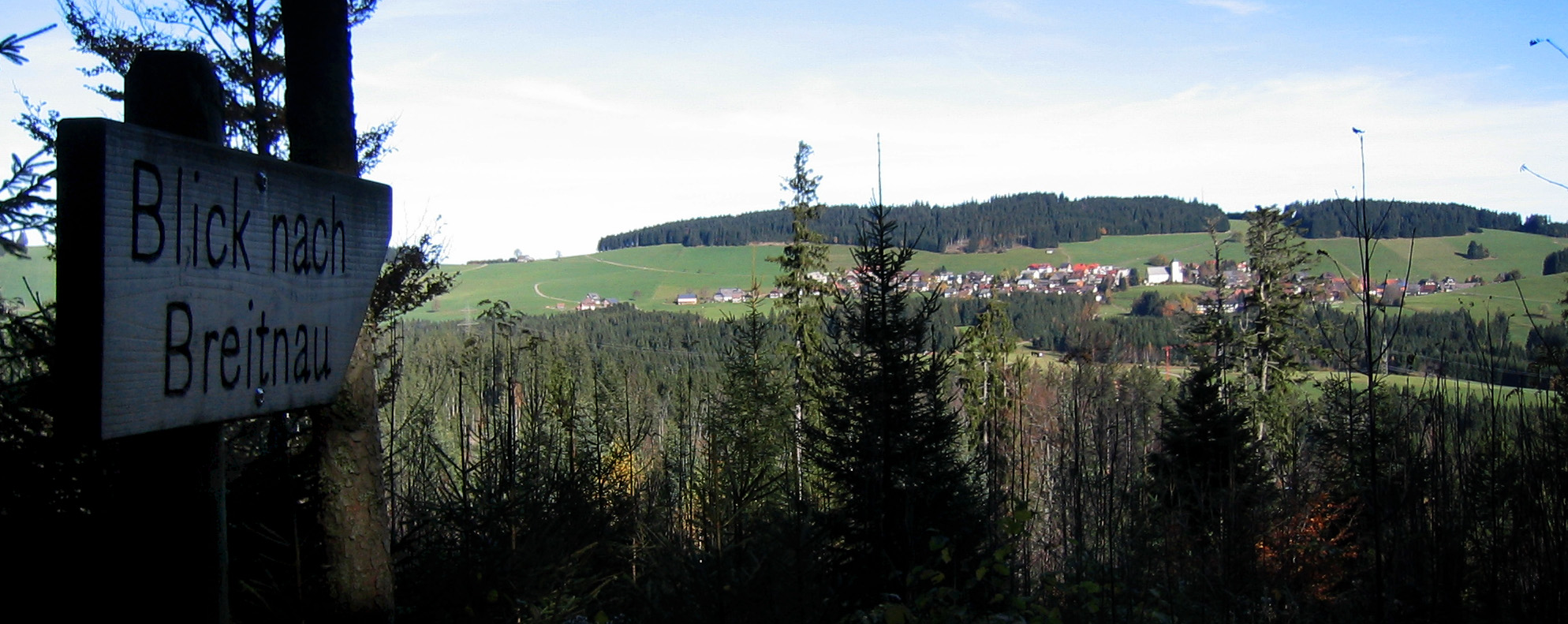
View of Breitnau from the Piketfelsen rocks in autumn

Breitnau has been a spa (Kurort) since 1970.

=== Transport ===
The Black Forest High Road (B 500) runs past Breitnau from north to south.

Since 21 May 1887 the Höllental Railway, with its station in Hinterzarten has linked Breitnau to the national railway network. The former railway stations of Hirschsprung, Posthalde and Höllsteig (near the Ravenna Gorge), which all lie within the municipality of Breitnau, are no longer served. In addition, Breitnau is served by bus lines 7216 (Freiburg – St.Peter – St. Märgen – Breitnau – Hinterzarten) and 7261 (Neustadt – St. Märgen) run by the Südbadenbus company.

== Culture and sights ==
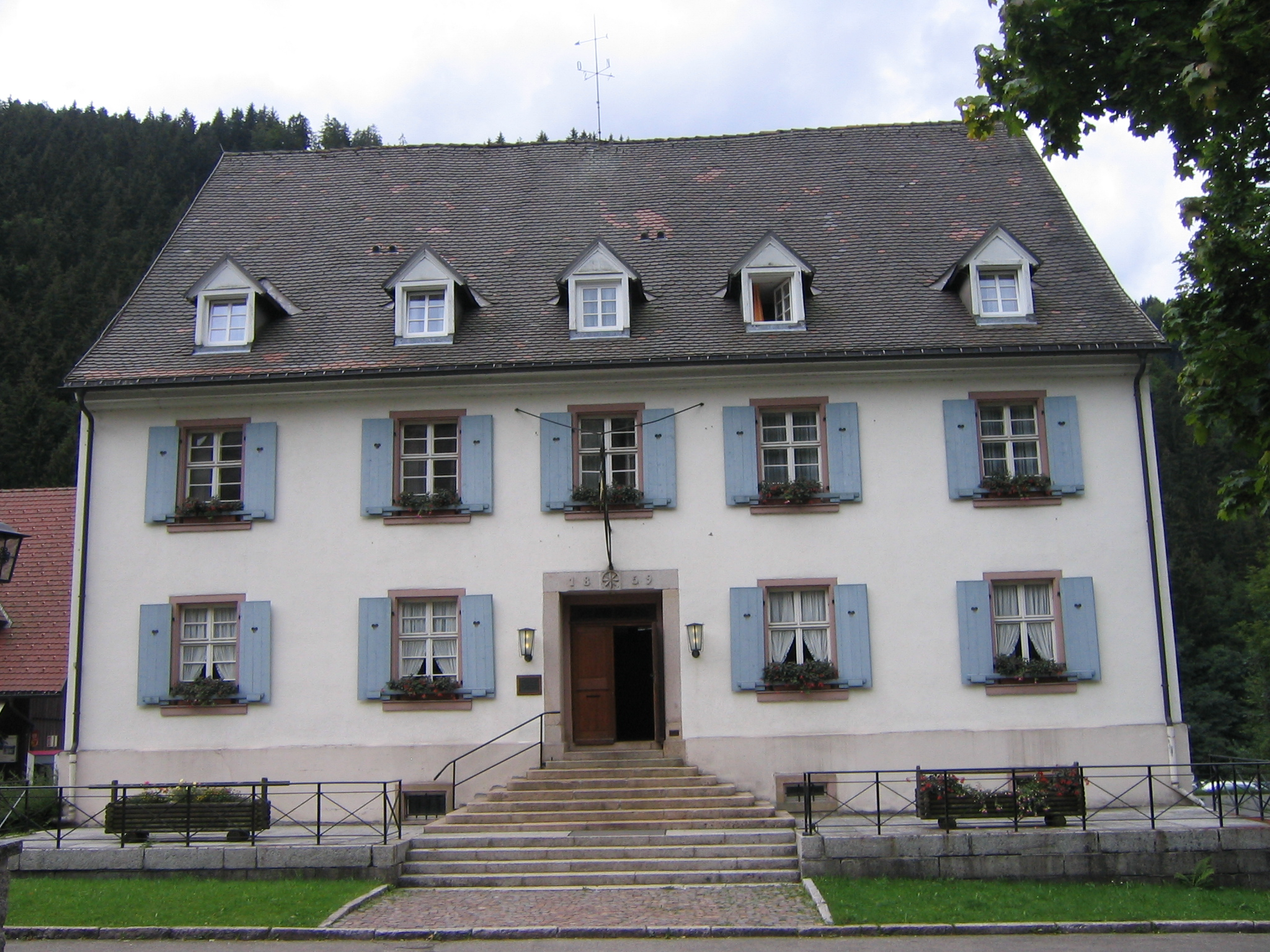
Goethe stayed in this house near Hofgut Sternen on 29 September 1779.

The Hirschsprung is a crag above a ravine-like narrows in the Höllental.

Sights include the Ravenna Bridge at the lower end of the Ravenna Gorge, a railway viaduct on the Höllental Railway. Below the viaduct is the Hotel Hofgut Sternen, which has stood for over 250 years. Goethe (1779) and Mendelssohn (1837) both stayed here. In 1770 Marie Antoinette stayed here at the Hofgut Sternen during her bridal journey to Paris. There is a glassworks in a side building. In the vicinity stands the 800-year-old St. Oswald's Chapel with its Late Gothic altar.

There is a path down the Ravenna Gorge, a steep, rocky side valley of the Hollental which leads to the Breitnau Plateau.

Also worth visiting is the old vicarage, near the village church, which has been faithfully restored.

== Personalities ==
- Alois Faller (born 1812 in Höllsteig; died 1882 in New York), lawyer, revolutionary and member of parliament
- Lorenz Helmle (born 1783 in Breitnau; died 1849 in Freiburg im Breisgau), stained-glass artist
- Andreas Helmle (born 1784 in Breitnau; died 1839 in Freiburg im Breisgau), stained-glass artist
- Conrad Ruf (born 1840 in Breitnau; died 1922 in Freiburg im Breisgau), photographer
- Martin Wangler (born 1969 in Freiburg im Breisgau), actor and cabaret artist, lives with his family in Breitnau
