= Martin Wangler =

German actor (born 1969)

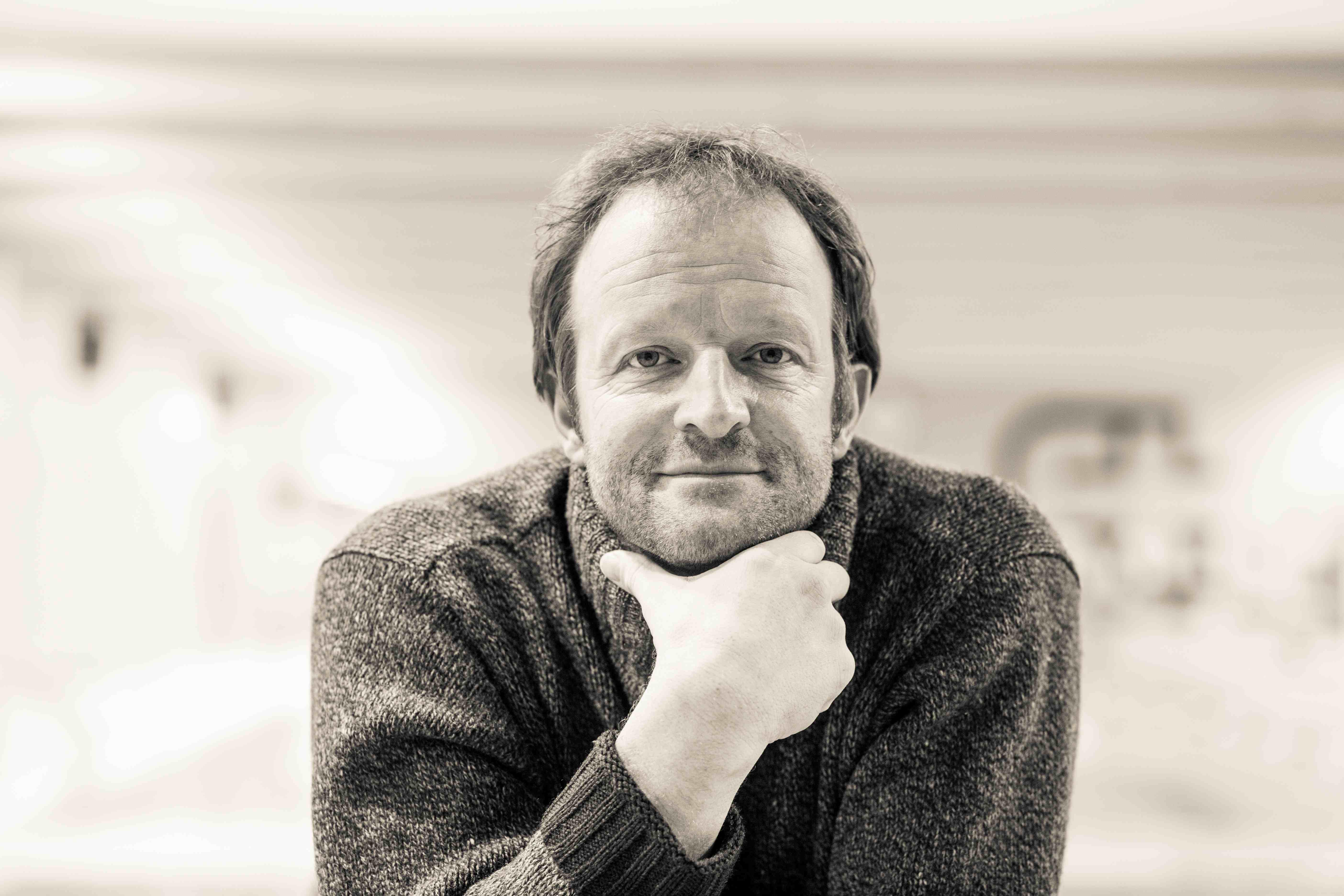

Martin Wangler (born 11 July 1969) is a German actor and cabaret artist who became primarily known through his role as Bernd Clemens in the SWR series Die Fallers and through his cabaret character, Fidelius Waldvogel.

== Life ==
Martin Wangler was born on 11 July 1969 in Freiburg im Breisgau in southwest Germany. He lives with his family in Breitnau, where he attended primary and secondary school until 1984. This was followed by training as a carpenter. From 1991 to 1994 Wangler completed his secondary education at Abitur level. In 1995, he began his acting training at the Mozarteum college in Salzburg, Austria, whence he graduated in 1999 with a magister artium. This was followed by engagements at the Salzburg Festival, at the Tyrolean State Theatre in Innsbruck, at the Oldenburg State Theatre and until 2003 at the Ingolstadt Municipal Theatre.

Wangler has been a freelance actor, cabaret artist and musician since 2005. In his evening programmes, which appeared from 2005, he portrays a character from the Black Forest, Fidelius Waldvogel. Since 2016, he has toured for around three weeks each summer with his Fidelius Waldvogel – Heimat.tour with a vintage tractor and an original travelling stage across the Black Forest. Wangler has also played the role of Bernd Clemens in the SWR Black Forest series The Fallers. He also appears in various film projects and in guest roles such as in Tatort ("Crime Scene").

Since 2009, Wangler has been artistic director of the High Black Forest Cabaret Festival. He is the initiator and main participant for the preservation and dissemination of the Baden card game Cego, for which he gives annual Cego courses at the Adult Education Centre in the Black Forest. From 2003 to 2014 he worked as a role player at the Audi Academy in Ingolstadt and is also a narrator on SWR radio.

== Cabaret ==
In his cabaret programmes, Martin Wangler always appears in his dialect character, Fidelius Waldvogel. Fidelius Waldvogel is a down-to-earth native of the Black Forest: farmer, poacher and outdoorsman, who deals musically and poetically with various themes from his life.

Wangler works with the dialect rock group LUDDI (Mundartrocker trifft Stubenhocker) and with Swabian cabaret artiste, Heike Sauer, alias "Marlies Blume" (Baden trifft Schwaben and others).

=== Stage appearances ===
- 2005: Breitnau calling, a cultural cabaret evening
- 2009: Ein Wilderer Abend, a musical cabaret
- 2012: Zwischen Himmelreich und Höllental, music and cabaret
- 2016: Nächste Ausfahrt: Heimat!, cabaret from the travelling stage

== Filmography ==
- Since 2007: Die Fallers as Bernd Clemens
- 2014: Dahoam is Dahoam as Bernd Clemens

== Discography ==
- 2007: Breitnau calling
- 2010: „Ja, so fahren wir Ski! official song of the 2010 Nordic Junior World Ski Championships
- 2015: Rehragout live
- 2016: Dem Skisport sei Heimat, song for the 125th anniversary of skiing in the Black Forest

== Radio plays ==
- 2008: Mordlauf. Radio Tatort, SWR
- 2013: einfach Märchenhaft; grimmsche Märchen, Alemannic German Neu, SWR
- 2015: Bierleichen, radio play of the novel of the same name by Roland Weis, SWR

== Prizes ==
- 2009: Baden-Württemberg Small Arts Prize
- 2012: Kultur-Grand-Prix
- 2014: Schwarzwälder Hirschrufmeister

== Cego ==
Wangler is a keen player of the Black Forest Tarot card game, Cego, a game threatened by extinction, but which is experiencing a revival. Wangler, a resident of Breitnau in the Black Forest, is part of a project to actively promote the game with live and online courses.
