= Hinterzarten =

- Municipality
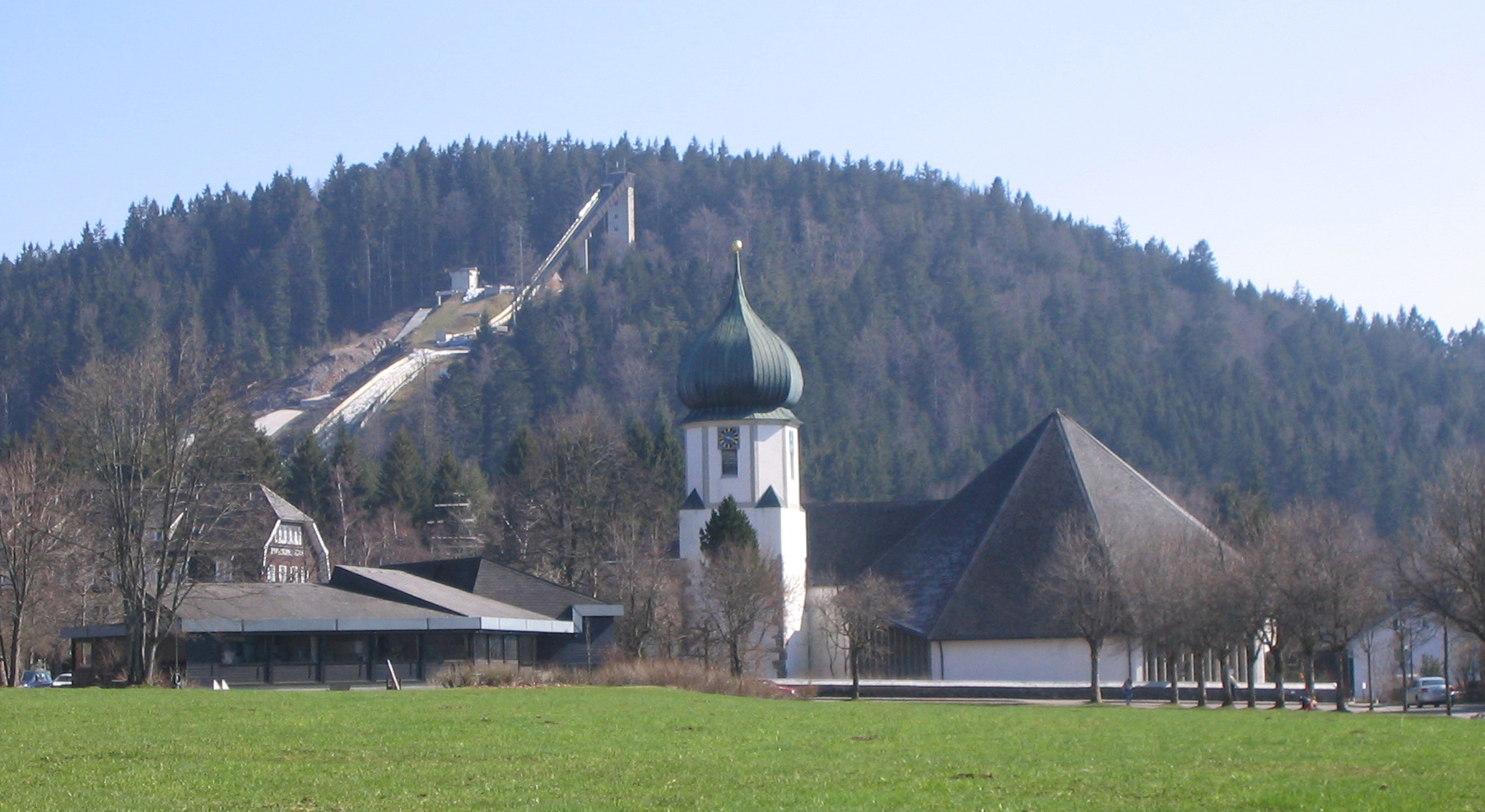
- Hinterzarten church with the Adlerschanze

- Coat of arms

- Location of Hinterzarten within Breisgau-Hochschwarzwald district
- Interactive map of Hinterzarten
- Location within Germany Location within Baden-Württemberg
- Coordinates: 47°54′N 8°6′E
- Country: Germany
- State: Baden-Württemberg
- Admin. region: Freiburg
- District: Breisgau-Hochschwarzwald
- Founded: 1148

Government
  - Mayor (2018–26): Klaus-Michael Tatsch (CDU)

Area
  - Total: 33.37 km^{2} (12.88 sq mi)
- Elevation: 893 m (2,930 ft)

Population (2025-12-31)
  - Total: 2,521
  - Density: 75.55/km^{2} (195.7/sq mi)
- Time zone: UTC+01:00 (CET)
  - Summer (DST): UTC+02:00 (CEST)
- Postal codes: 79856
- Dialling codes: 07652
- Vehicle registration: FR
- Website: www.hinterzarten.de

Hinterzarten (German pronunciation: [ˈhɪntɐˌtsaʁtn̩]) is a resort village in the Black Forest (German: Schwarzwald), located in the southwest of the state of Baden-Württemberg, Germany. Although Hinterzarten is mostly famous for its ski jumping, it has many other tourist attractions.

== Geography ==
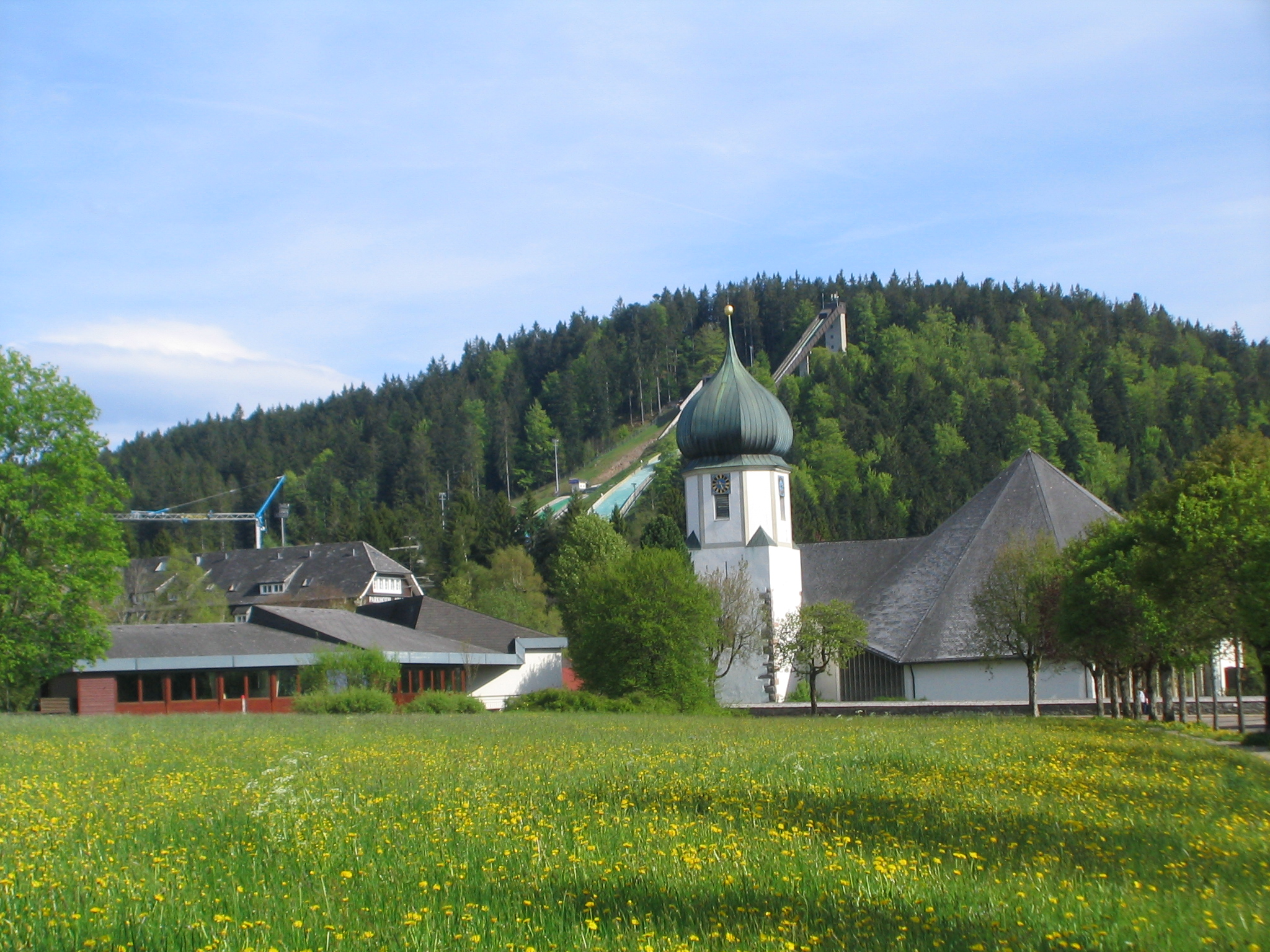
Hinterzarten: view of the church and Adler Ski Jump

=== Location ===
Hinterzarten is located 893 m above sea level (NN), which is just below that of the Feldberg (1,493 m above NN), the highest mountain in the Black Forest. The municipality descends to the southeastern end of Lake Titisee (850 m above NN), although its lowest point is the Sternenrank at 740 m above NN. Hinterzarten is located within the Southern Black Forest Nature Park, and the Zartenbach stream flows through the municipality. Mountain peaks within the municipality include the Windeckkopf (1,209 m).

=== Climate ===
Precipitation diagram

Hinterzarten's annual precipitation is 1,406 mm, which is thus in amongst the highest in Germany. The driest month is September; the most precipitation falls in December.

=== Neighbouring municipalities ===
Hinterzarten's neighbouring municipalities are Breitnau, Titisee-Neustadt, Lenzkirch, Feldberg and Oberried, all belonging to the county of Breisgau-Hochschwarzwald.

=== Municipal subdivisions ===
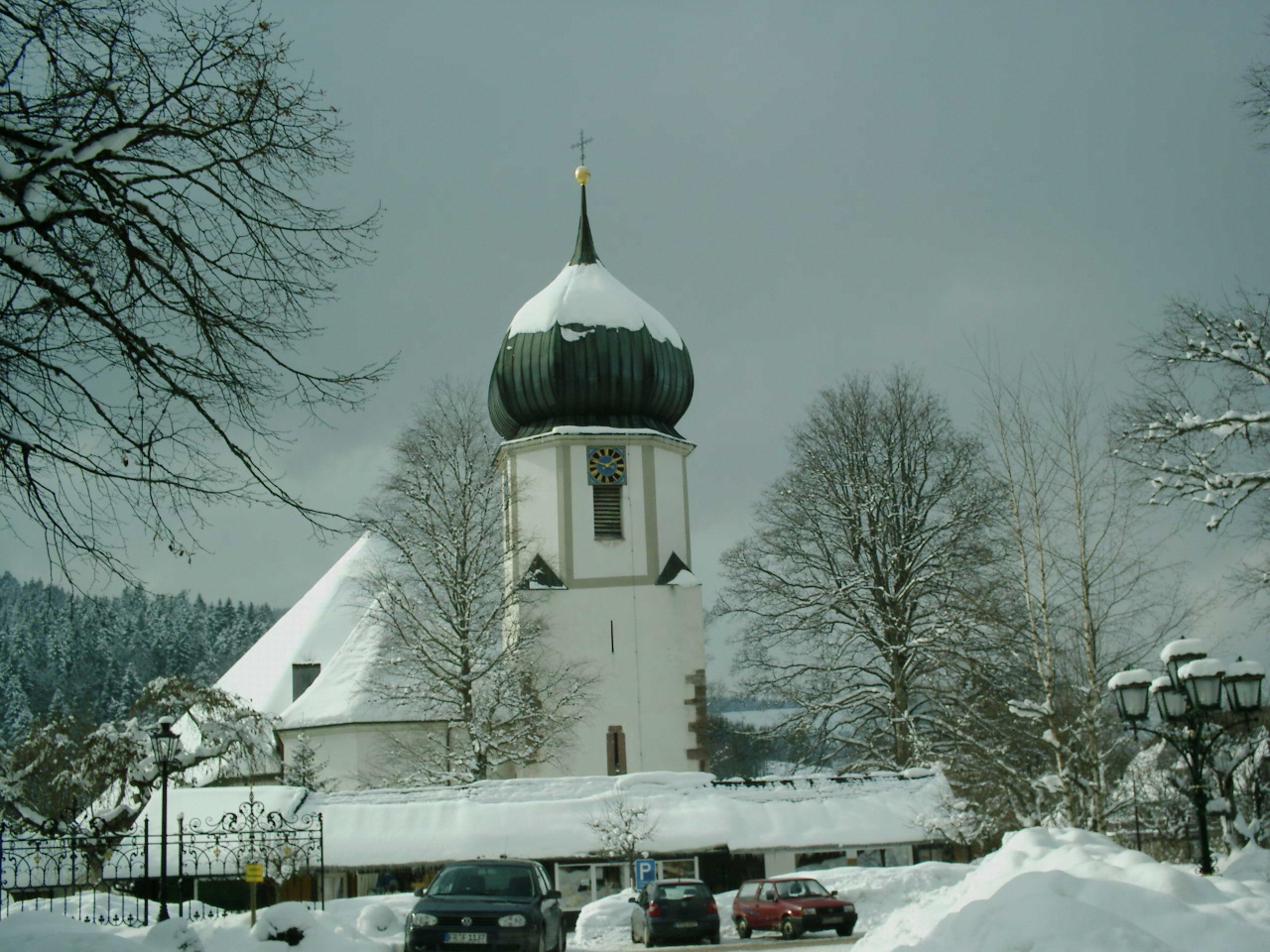
The church, covered in snow

The following subdivisions are part of the municipality of Hinterzarten: Hinterzarten village, the hamlets (Zinken) of Alpersbach, Am Feldberg, Bisten (partly also in Breitnau), Bruderhalde, Erlenbruck, Löffeltal, Oberzarten, Rinken, Rotwasser, Windeck and Winterhalde, as well as the residences of Altenvogtshütte (Auf Stucken), Ramselegut, Dorneck, Fürsatz(hof) and Silberberg. Within the municipality are the abandoned villages of Bankgallihof, Bäuerlehof, Imberihof, Rufenhof, Seehäusle and Waldhof.

== History ==
Hinterzarten was founded in 1148. In the beginning, Hinterzarten was actually called "Hinter der Straß" (behind the street), and Breitnau to the north was "Vor der Straß" (in front of the street). Between 1708 and 1750 the village's name changed to Hinterzarten, partially due a small river in the area called Zartenbach. By 1755 the first postal road to Hinterzarten was built through the Höllental, and in 1887 a railway stretch for tourists was opened.

In 1923, after the foundation of the Ski Club Hinterzarten, the Kirchwaldschanze ski jump was built (jumping was discontinued in 1974); and in 1924 the Adlerschanze ski-jump was built. The Adlerschanze still stands today after being renovated and rebuilt multiple times.

In 1964 Hinterzarten officially became a "climatic healing resort" (German: Heilklimatischer Kurort).

== Sports ==
Besides the 4-hill ski jumping complex, Hinterzarten also has three ski lifts, a tennis center, a cross-country skiing center, a soccer club, and has been a member of the Black Forest Nordic walking club since 2003.

The Black Forest Ultra Bike Marathon (German) starts in Hinterzarten. Hinterzarten hosted the FIS (Fédération Internationale de Ski) Nordic Junior World Ski Championships and the Under-23 Cross-Country World Championships in 2010.

=== Famous ski jumpers from Hinterzarten ===
- Dieter Thoma
- Georg Thoma
- Sven Hannawald

== Attractions ==
Hiking and bicycle trails abound, and in the winter over 100 km of cross-country ski paths are prepared. One of the most popular hiking trails is the one from Hinterzarten to Titisee. A "nature experience" trail (German: Naturerlebnispfad) was opened in 2000. The Adlerschanze ski jump is one of the Ski jumping Grand Prix Tournament hills. The Tournament reaches the Adlerschanze in early August, and lasts one weekend (two days). About 20,000 people attend the contest.

The Black Forest Ski Museum covers the beginning of skiing and the early techniques and equipment used on the nearby Feldberg. There is also a museum of ancient agricultural engineering, with old farm equipment and machines; the museum is located in a 400-year-old farmhouse.

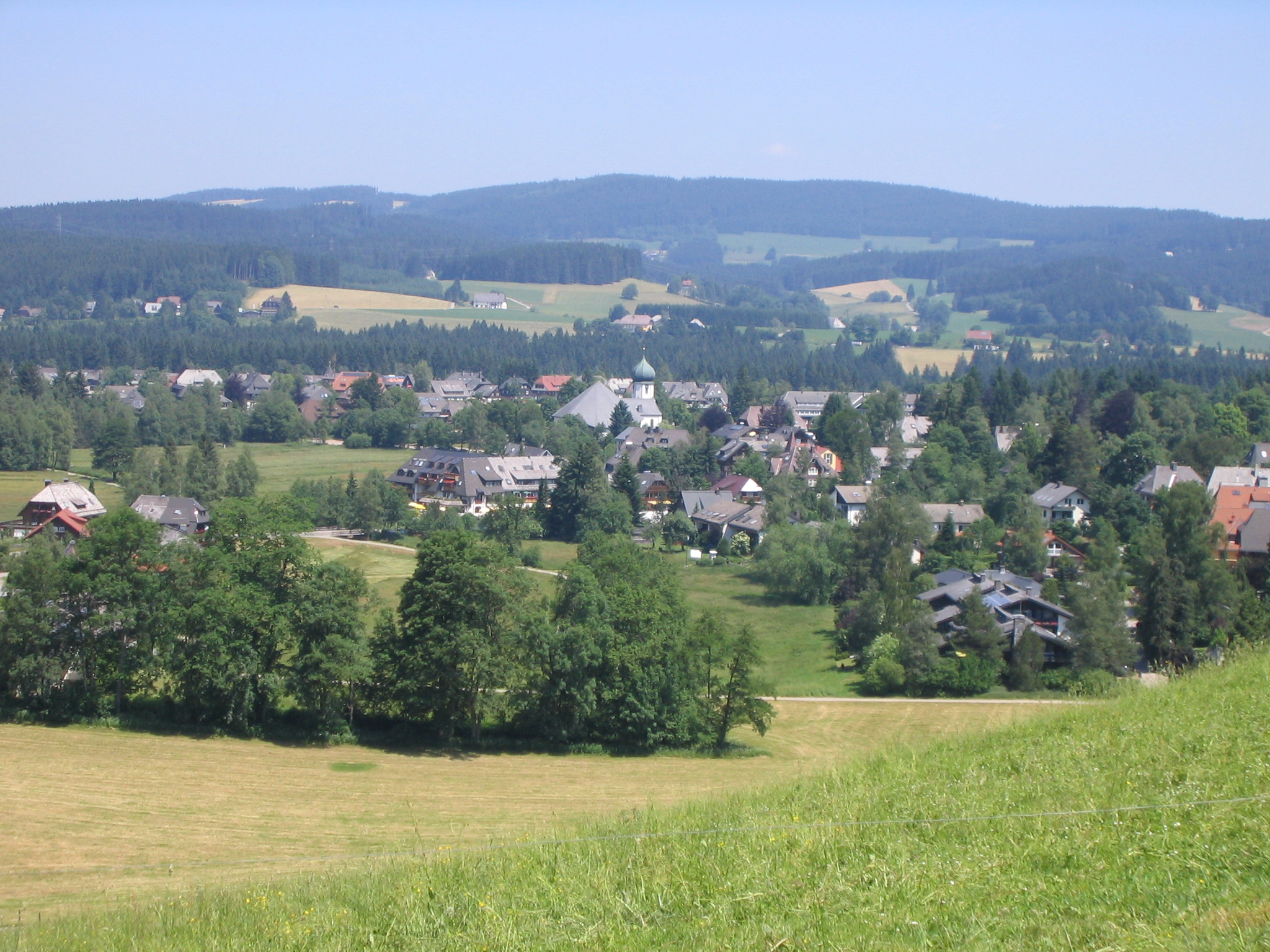
Hinterzarten in summer
