= Thai Union Group =

Producer of seafood-based food products

Thai Union Group PCL
- Type: Public
- Traded as: SET: TU
- ISIN: TH0450010Y08
- Industry: Food
- Founded: Thailand (17 March 1977; 47 years ago)
- Headquarters: Samut Sakhon, Thailand
- Area served: Worldwide
- Key people: Thiraphong Chansiri (President and CEO); Thiraphong Chansiri (Executive Chairman)
- Products: Seafood (frozen, canned, chilled)
- Revenue: ▲140 billion baht (2017)
- Net income: ▲6 billion baht
- Total assets: ▲146.3 billion baht
- Total equity: ▲48.2 billion baht
- Number of employees: 49,000 (2017)
- Website: www.thaiunion.com

Thai Union Group PCL is a Thailand-based producer of seafood based products. It was founded in 1977, and was listed on the Stock Exchange of Thailand (SET) on 22 November 1994.

Thai Union operates worldwide with plant facilities in France, Germany, Ghana, Poland, Portugal, Papua New Guinea, Norway, Seychelles, Scotland, Vietnam, Thailand and the United States. Its business includes tuna, shrimp, sardines, mackerel, salmon, pet food and prepared foods.

== Brand portfolio ==
Thai Union's brand portfolio includes:

- Bellotta (business in Thailand)
- Chicken of the Sea (business in the US)
- Fisho (business in Thailand)
- John West (business in the Netherlands and the UK)
- King Oscar (business in Norway)
- Mareblu (business in Italy)
- Marvo (business in Thailand)
- Parmentier (business in France)
- Petit Navire (business in France)
- Rügen Fisch (business in Germany)
- Sealect (business in Thailand)

== Financial performance ==
In 2017, the Thai Union had revenues of 140 billion baht, with a net profit of six billion baht. Total assets amounted to 146.3 billion baht. Total shareholder equity was 48.2 billion baht.

Thai Union's target was to achieve US$8 billion in revenue by 2020. The revenue contribution of its different businesses as of 2017 were:

- Ambient seafood business, 45 percent
- Frozen and chilled seafood and related business, 42 percent
- PetCare, value-added and others, 13 percent

== History ==
- 1977: Established on 17 March 1977 as Asian Pacific Thai Tuna Co, Ltd. with an initial capital of 25 million baht.
- 1988: Renamed Thai Union Frozen Products PLC in March 1988.
- 2010: Acquired MW Brands (now Thai Union Europe) from Trilantic Capital Partners for €680 million.
- 2010: Expanded and diversified into the pet food business with U.S. Pet Nutrition LLC.
- 2013: Became the first Thai company to join the UN Global Compact, an initiative aimed at "promoting sustainable and socially responsible policies."
- 2013: Became a founding member of the International Seafood Sustainability Foundation (ISSF).
- 2014: Signed a deal for MW Brands to take over 40-year-old French company MerAlliance, the fourth-largest smoked salmon producer in Europe. MerAlliance's revenue for the year to 31 March 2014 was US$220 million.
- 2014–2017: Included in the Dow Jones Sustainability Indices (DJSI) for four consecutive years, with the company ranked in the 97th percentile among companies in the industry.
- 2015: Rebranded as Thai Union Group PLC (TU). This rebranding was part of an initiative to "integrate all its [Thai Union] subsidiaries under a single new corporate vision, mission and core values, as well as one unified corporate brand."
- 2016: Launched SeaChange, the company's sustainability strategy.
- 2016: Chicken of the Sea recalled 107,000 five-ounce cans of tuna in the US due to undercooking because of an equipment malfunction at an undisclosed factory.

== Acquisitions ==
- 1997: Completes first overseas investment with the acquisition of Chicken of the Sea, USA's third canned tuna brand.
- 2003: Acquired Empress International Ltd, a frozen seafood importer and distributor in the US.
- 2006: Established Chicken of the Sea Frozen Foods to market frozen seafood in the US. Chicken of the Sea Frozen Foods later merged with Empress International and was renamed Tri-Union Frozen Products, Inc.
- 2006: Acquired majority stake in PT Jui Fa International Food, a canned tuna producer and exporter based in Indonesia.
- 2008: Acquired majority stake in Yueh Chyang Canned Food, a canned seafood producer and exporter based in Vietnam.
- 2009: Invested in Avanti Feeds Limited, a shrimp feed and frozen shrimp producer based in India.
- 2010: Founded US Pet Nutrition LLC to produce and market pet food in the US.
- 2014: Further expansion into Europe with the acquisition of MerAlliance, Europe's fourth smoked salmon producer and number one producer in France.
- 2014: Acquired King Oscar AS of Norway, a shelf-stable sardine brand in Norway, USA, and Australia and with over 140 years of heritage.
- 2016: Acquired German seafood company Rügen Fisch AG.
- 2016: Makes a US$575 million investment in Red Lobster, the world's largest seafood restaurant company.
- 2020: It along with a few other investors bought the remaining equity in Red Lobster from GGC, making it full owner of the chain. In May 2024, Red Lobster filed for Chapter 11 bankruptcy protection, announced the closure of at least 99 locations, and Thai Union issued the following statement: “After detailed analysis, we have determined that Red Lobster’s ongoing financial requirements no longer align with our capital allocation priorities and therefore are pursuing an exit of our minority investment.”

== Issues ==
=== Labor ===
==== Greenpeace accusations ====
The Thai Union was investigated by Greenpeace, which showed a human trafficking report of Tier 3, meaning the company is not completely compliant with the standards. People are forced to work at sea for months, and sometimes years at a time. Being out at sea for long periods of time keeps them from being in contact with authorities, which allows the company to use such methods. They are going through forced labor, ultimately threatened with abuse, including getting beat with stingray tails, if they do not complete the tasks given to them by the Thai Union. The workers, who do not know any better, are being trafficked with no way of escaping.

Thai Union released a statement in response to the accusations made by Greenpeace in 2015. It reiterated its commitment to human rights and the company's vision of "an industry that respects the oceans and protects marine life, offers safe employment for millions of people around the world, supports the development of coastal communities and continues to provide a safe, affordable and healthy food source for a global population well into the future." Thai Union also noted that it works closely with the International Seafood Sustainability Foundation (ISSF) to "benefit the wider tuna fishing industry" and concluded by calling on Greenpeace to join the "industry debate that is already underway, to work towards achieving our shared objectives."

==== Slave labor and human rights ====
Thai Union was named, but was not a defendant, in a lawsuit brought against Nestle Corporation for violating California laws. Thai Union has been under scrutiny since the July 2015 publication of a New York Times article citing a former fisher stating he had been held captive on a vessel supplying a mother ship that ended up selling to Thai Union's Songkhla canning operation.

In a response to the New York Times, the Thai Union re-asserted its commitment to the protection of human rights. A spokesperson stated the company worked to prevent "any human trafficking or any human rights violation of any kind" highlighting procedures that are in place, such as routine audits of its canneries and boats in port to ensure against forced and child labor.

In 2015, the Thai Union released new codes of conduct, replacing the company's 2013 code of conduct. The "more stringent" new code of conduct allows for higher levels of "accountability and transparency" and showcased Thai Union's commitment to "earn the trust of customers, consumers and the world by operating with integrity and high ethical standards". The company also claims to have terminated relationships with 17 suppliers as a result of forced labor or human trafficking violations since the start of 2015, and have ended the use of employment brokers to source for workers for its seafood processing plants to stop debt bondage.

In December 2016, the Thai Union and the World Tuna Purse Seine Organization (WTPO) signed a memorandum of understanding (MOU) to establish a framework to ensure fair labor practices. The MOU includes the establishment and implementation of best practices on fair labor standards in operations.

==== Slave labor in the shrimp industry ====
Thailand's seafood industry, and by implication, the Thai Union, was the subject of a year-long study of the Thai shrimp industry commissioned by Nestlé. The report, conducted by Verité on behalf of Vevey-based Nestlé, was released on 23 November 2015. It found "indicators of forced labor, trafficking, and child labor to be present among sea-based and land-based workers."

In a statement issued on 10 December 2015, the Thai Union declared that it will cease working with all shrimp processing subcontractors by the end of 2015. The company said that it would bring all shrimp processing operations in-house to enable full oversight. All processing work will be directly controlled by the Thai Union to ensure that all workers, whether migrants or Thai, have safe, legal employment and are treated fairly and with dignity. Thai Union estimates that subcontractors employ about 1,000 migrant workers. Andy Hall, a British human rights defender and a migrant worker specialist based in Thailand, said that "Thai Union ... must be commended for belatedly moving seafood primary processing in house."

=== Environment ===
==== Sourcing ====
In October 2015 Greenpeace accused Thai Union subsidiary John West (UK) of making a "plainly false" claim that customers can trace its tuna back to the vessel that caught it. John West's website includes a tool that allows customers to enter the can code to "see exactly where your fish came from". The tool does not identify sources of Thai tuna and instead invites customers to email John West. John West said that the problem is a website limitation, and all its tuna is fully traceable. Greenpeace has also ranked John West last in sustainability surveys because 98 percent of its tuna was caught using "fish aggregation devices" that kill other marine wildlife.

Thai Union has committed to the following by 2020:

- Full traceability for all purchased seafood, reducing the risk of IUU fishing in the global fishing industry.

Specific to its tuna business, Thai Union has committed to the following by 2020:

- Digital traceability: We will work with innovative technology providers to develop a system for digital traceability.
- Tuna sourcing policies: We will have aligned every one of our tuna sourcing policies everywhere in the world. We will publish these policies in line with our commitment to transparency.
- Academic and scientific research: We will work with academic bodies, universities and scientific institutions to support research into fishery improvements.
- Innovation: We have developed the Global Innovation Incubator in Thailand to look at all aspects of innovation and research into tuna from species to processing to packaging.
- Post-harvest risk assessment: We will work with fishery experts to address the issues around tuna grading, utilization of non-target species and low-economic-value species, and care-of-catch to ensure high standards are met from harvest to plate.

Thai Union Europe is working with WWF-UK and WWF France between 2014 and 2018 to improve the sustainability of seafood species and work towards Marine Stewardship Council (MSC) certification and Aquaculture Stewardship Council (ASC) certification across the Thai Union Europe supply chain.

In December 2016, Thai Union announced a strategy to ensure 100 percent of its branded tuna is sustainably sourced with a commitment of achieving a minimum of 75 percent by 2020. As part of the new tuna strategy, the Thai Union is investing US$90 million in initiatives that will increase the supply of sustainable tuna. This includes establishing 11 new fishery improvement projects (FIPs) around the world.

In December 2016, eight of the world's largest seafood companies, including the Thai Union, issued a 10-point statement committing to action on ocean stewardship following the first "keystone dialogue" between scientists and business leaders. The companies committed to improving transparency and traceability, and reducing illegal, unreported, and unregulated (IUU) fishing in their supply chains.

In December 2016, Greenpeace reported that the Thai Union subsidiary, Lucky Union Foods Co. Ltd. (LUF), purchased surimi base from Pacific Marine Food Products Co. Ltd., a company which confirmed that it had sourced from "vessels of concern". LUF also supplied shaped surimi to Thai Union Manufacturing Co. Ltd. (TUM) for use in pet foods.

In February 2017, the Thai Union 2015 Sustainability Report earned the number one ranking in Asia for sustainability reporting in the Top 100 Seafood Firms' Transparency Benchmark from Seafood Intelligence, a global news service that reports on the seafood sector and evaluates the industry's sustainability data and transparency levels.

In March 2017, Thai Union and the United States Agency for International Development Oceans and Fisheries Partnership (USAID Oceans) announced a partnership to combat illegal, unreported, and unregulated (IUU) fishing, promote fair and ethical seafood supply chains, and improve the sustainability of fisheries in the Asia-Pacific region.

In June 2017, at a World Economic Forum (WEF) meeting in New York City, the Thai Union committed to the WEF's Tuna 2020 Traceability Declaration. The declaration supports the United Nations (UN) Sustainable Development Goals (SDGs) which were adopted by all 193 heads of state via a UN Resolution in September 2015 at a United Nations summit.

In June 2017, Thai Union Group signed a pledge as part of its membership in the Seafood Business for Ocean Stewardship (SeaBOS), committing to improve operations as well as challenge the rest of the seafood industry to follow, all with the goal of helping the world achieve the United Nations Sustainable Development Goals (SDGs).

In July 2017, Thai Union Group committed to measures that will tackle illegal fishing and overfishing, as well as improve the livelihoods of hundreds of thousands of workers throughout the company's supply chains, in an agreement with Greenpeace. Greenpeace and the Thai Union agreed to meet every six months to assess the company's progress and implementation.

In October 2017, a memorandum of understanding (MoU) was signed between WWF, Thai Union Europe, ACTEMSA S.A., and Industrias Alimenticias Leal Santos LTDA, to launch a Fishery Improvement Project (FIP) for the pole and line skipjack, yellowfin, and bigeye tuna fishery in the south and southeast coastal areas of Brazil. The aim of the FIP is to meet the standards of the Marine Stewardship Council (MSC), which assesses whether a fishery is well-managed and sustainable.

In March 2018, Thai Union Group joined forces with the Global Ghost Gear Initiative (GGGI) in a drive to reduce the growing problem of abandoned, lost, and discarded fishing gear (ALDFG) worldwide.

=== Others ===
==== Bumble Bee Foods ====
In December 2014, Thai Union announced it would spend US$1.5 billion to acquire Bumble Bee Foods. That deal was put in jeopardy after the US Department of Justice announced it began an anti-trust investigation into the company's over-pricing and competitive practices. Thai Union abandoned its purchase plans in early December 2015 after US officials objected on the grounds that it would reduce competition. "Consumers are better off without this deal," Bill Baer, assistant attorney general of the US Department of Justice's antitrust division, said...."Our investigation convinced us—and the parties knew or should have known from the get-go — that the market is not functioning competitively today, and further consolidation would only make things worse."

==== Dow Jones Sustainability Index (DJSI) Emerging Markets ====
In September 2017, Thai Union was named to the Dow Jones Sustainability Index (DJSI) Emerging Markets for the fourth year in a row. Thai Union's sustainability strategy, SeaChange®, successfully drove the score with industry best-in-class 100th percentile rankings for Climate Strategy, Materiality, Human Capital Development, Health and Nutrition, Water Related Risks, and Policy Influence.

==== FTSE4Good Emerging Index ====
In January 2017, the Thai Union was named to the FTSE4Good Emerging Index by FTSE Russell. The FTSE4Good Emerging Index is an extension of the FTSE4Good Index Series—the latter of which was launched in 2001 to help investors integrate environmental, social and governance (ESG) factors into their investment decisions and as a framework for corporate engagement and stewardship.

== See also ==
- Simplot
- Bolton Group
- Itochu
- FCF Co, Ltd.
