= Monte Calvo =

Monte Calvo may refer to:

- Monte Calvo (Picentini), mountain of Campania, Italy
- Monte Calvo (Gargano), mountain of Apulia, Italy

== See also ==
- Calvo (disambiguation)
