= Holbeinpferd =

Sculpture in Frieburg im Breisgau, Germany

Coordinates: 47°58′47″N 7°50′52″E

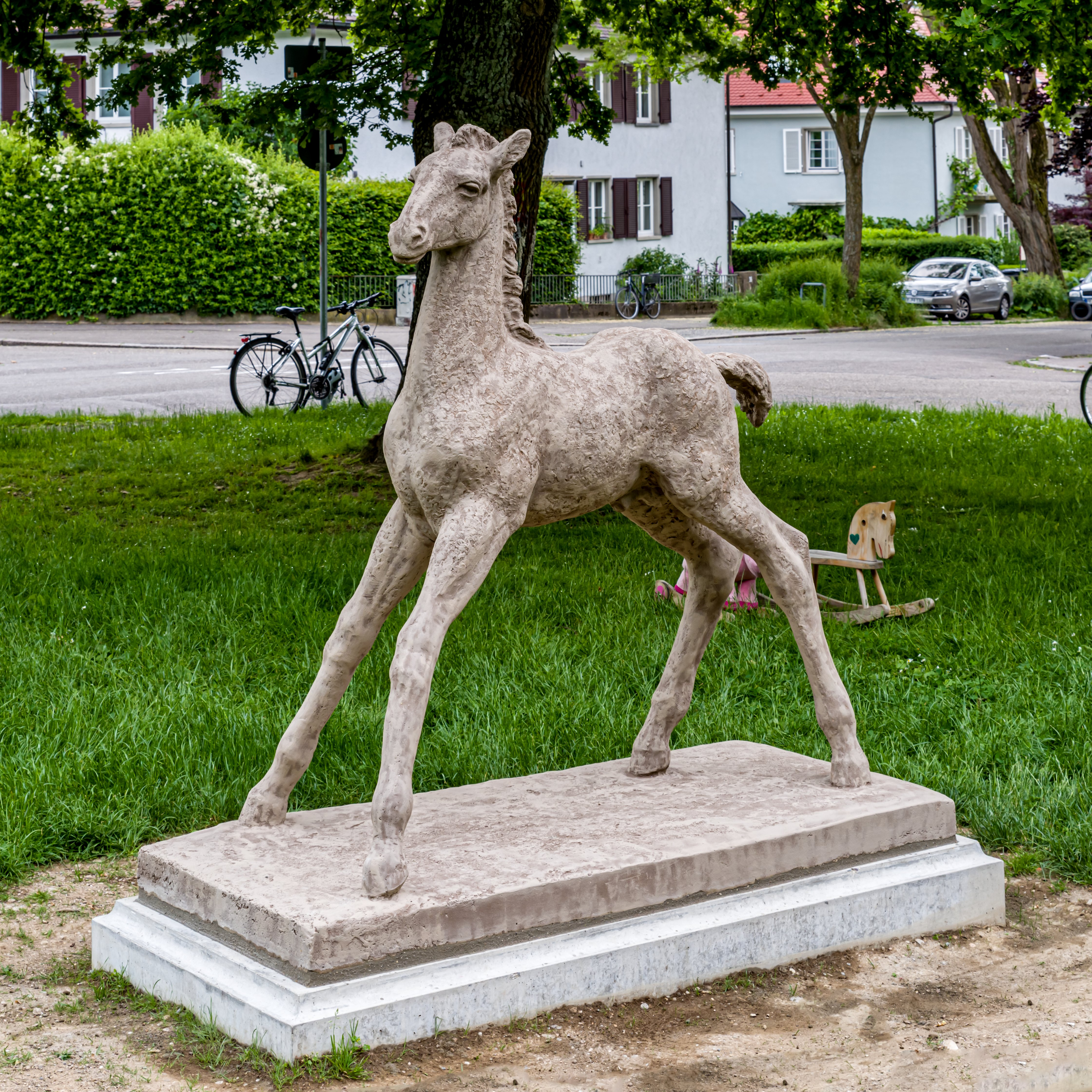
the Holbeinpferd immediately after restoration on June 3 2019

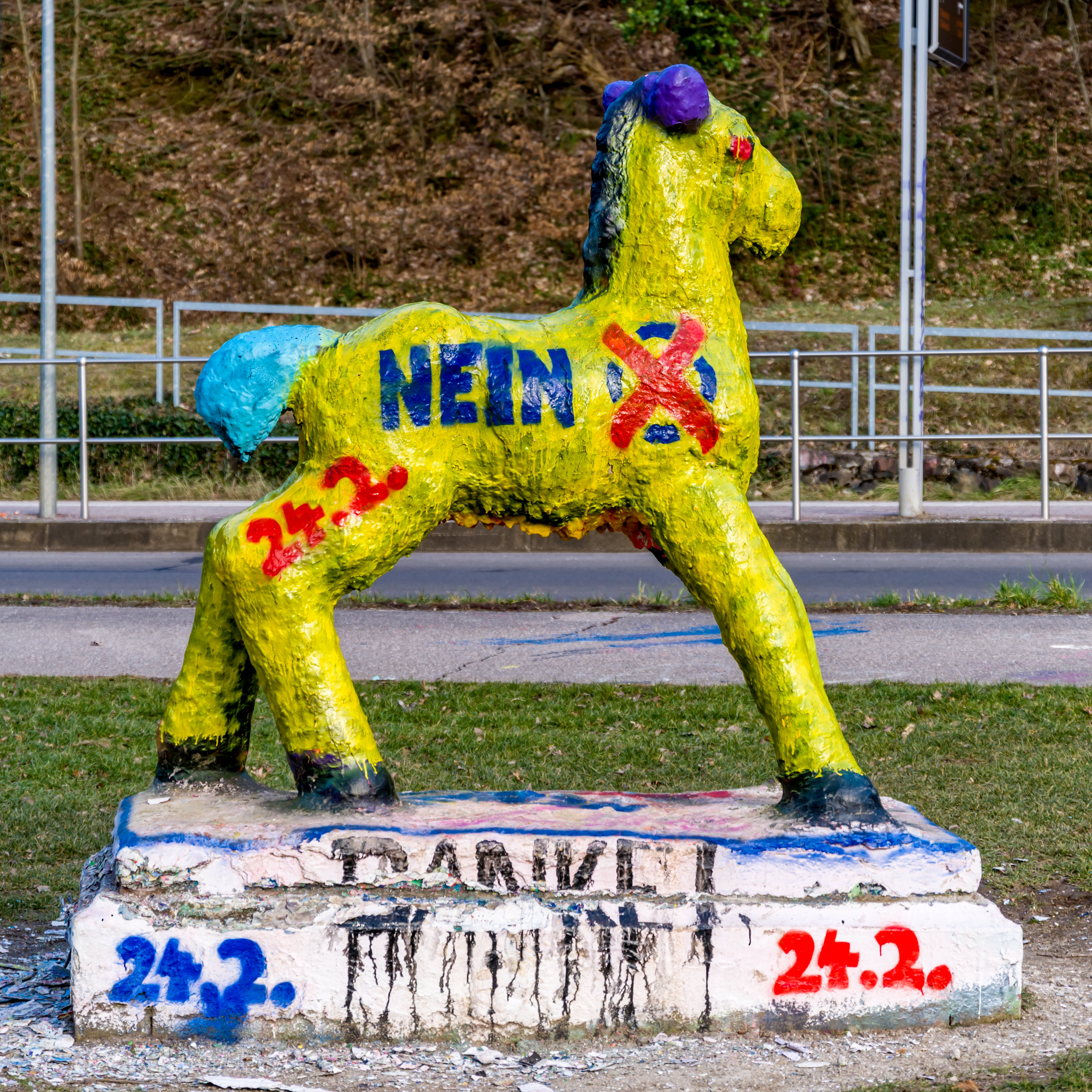
the Holbeinpferd during the referendum on new Freiburg district Dietenbach on February 24 2019

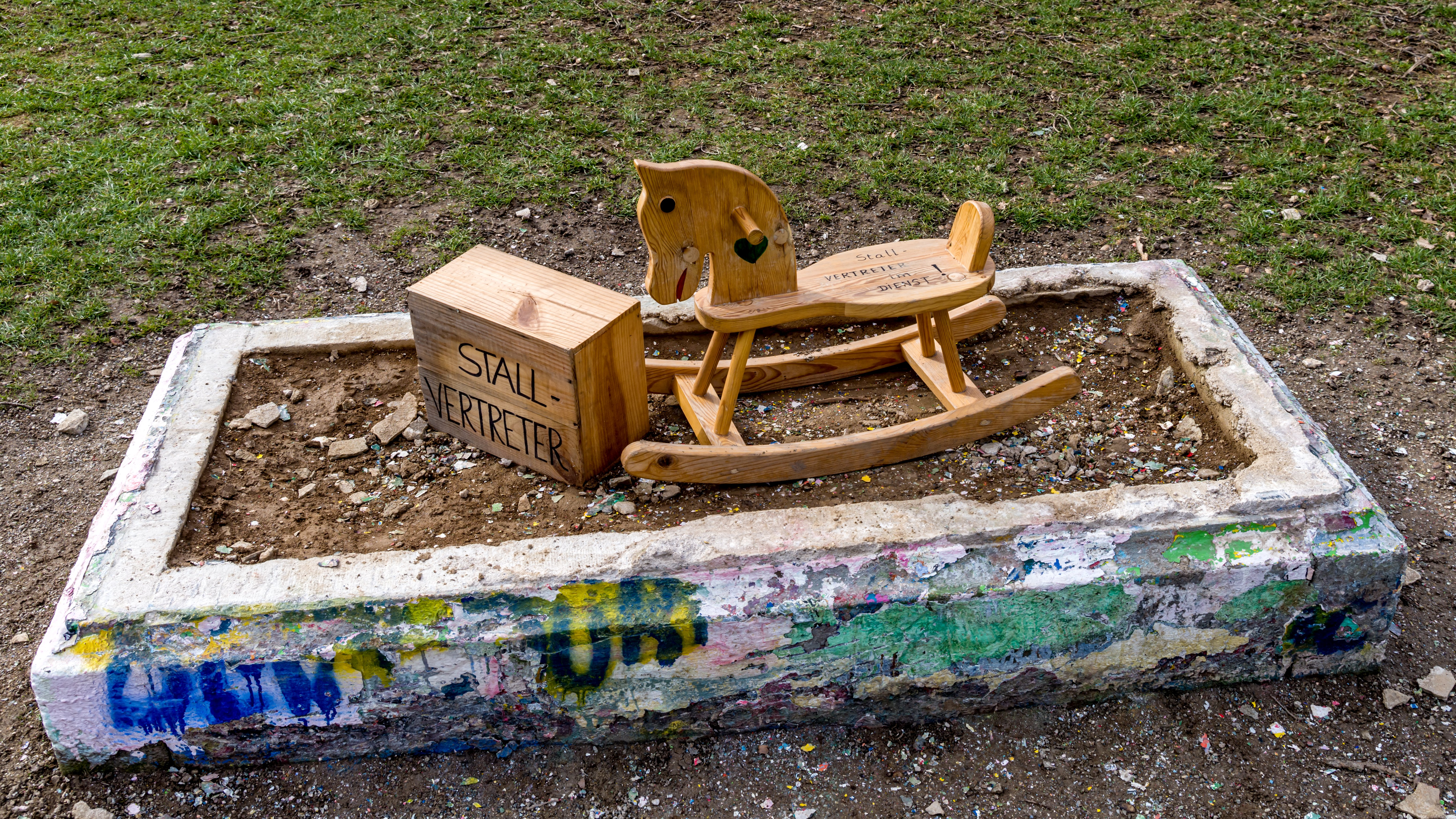
A stand-in while the sculpture is restored

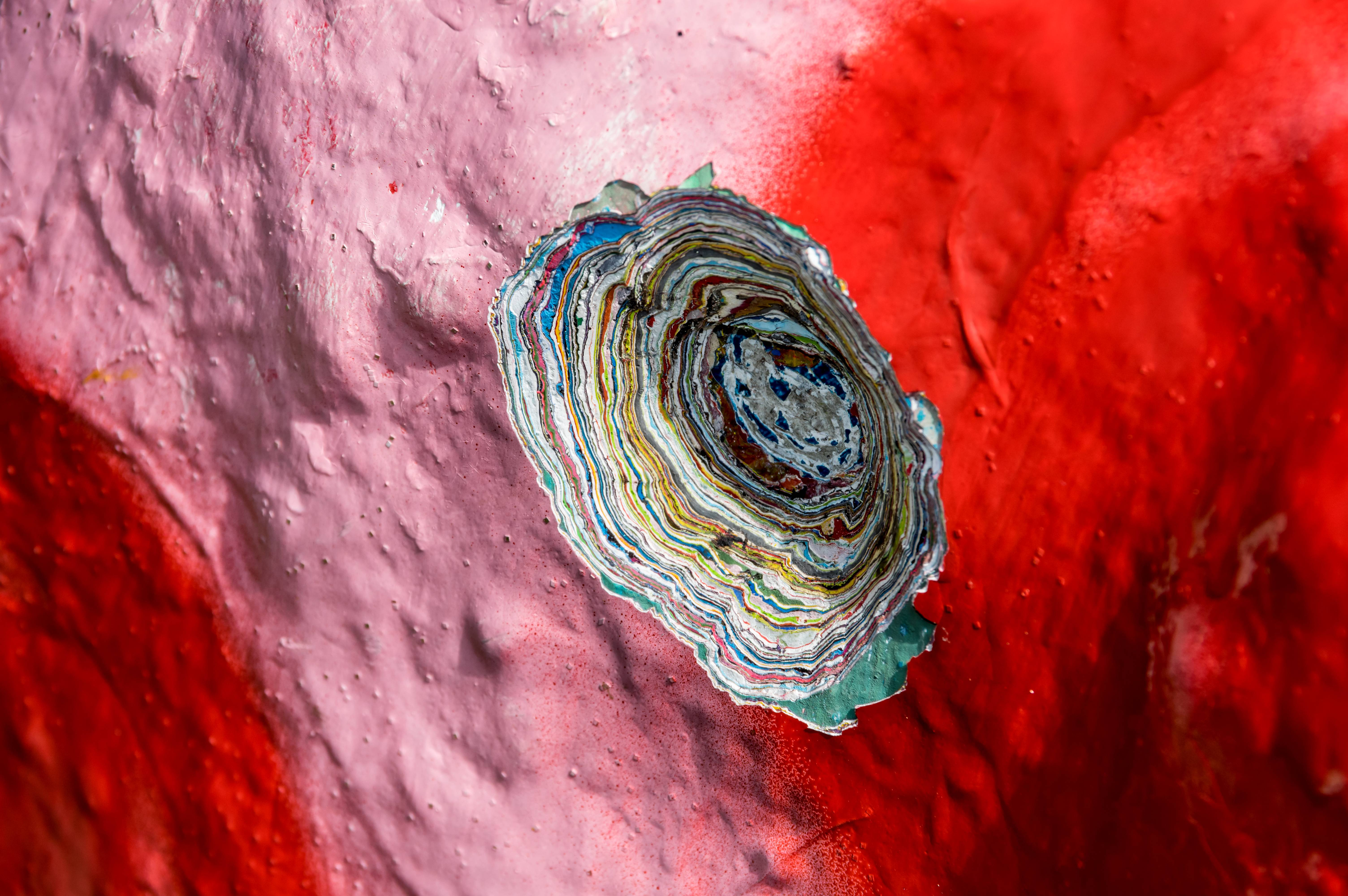
A peek at the over 120 layers of paint on the horse (September 2015)

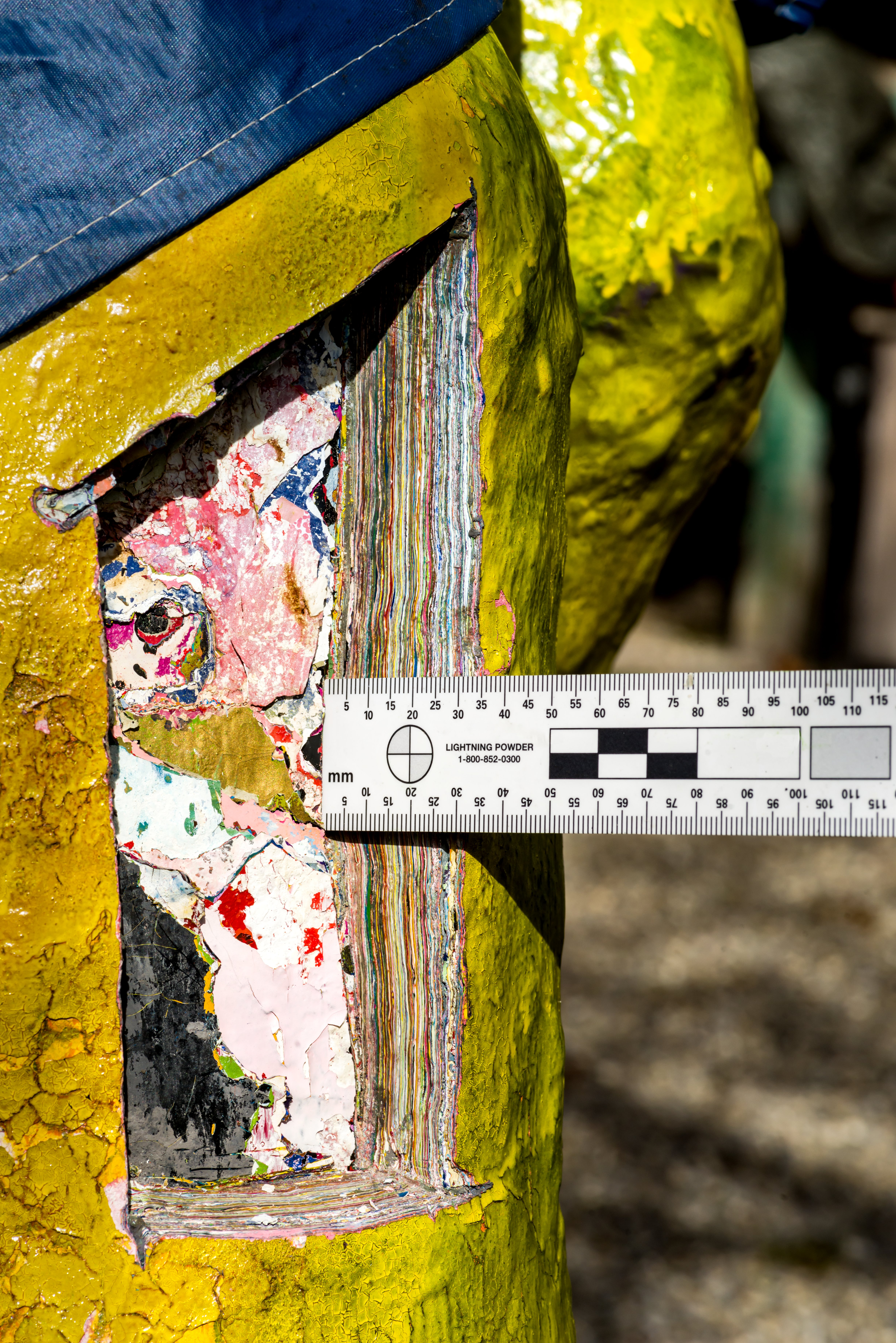
Holbeinpferdle, Restoration March 2019, the paint layers are 35mm thick

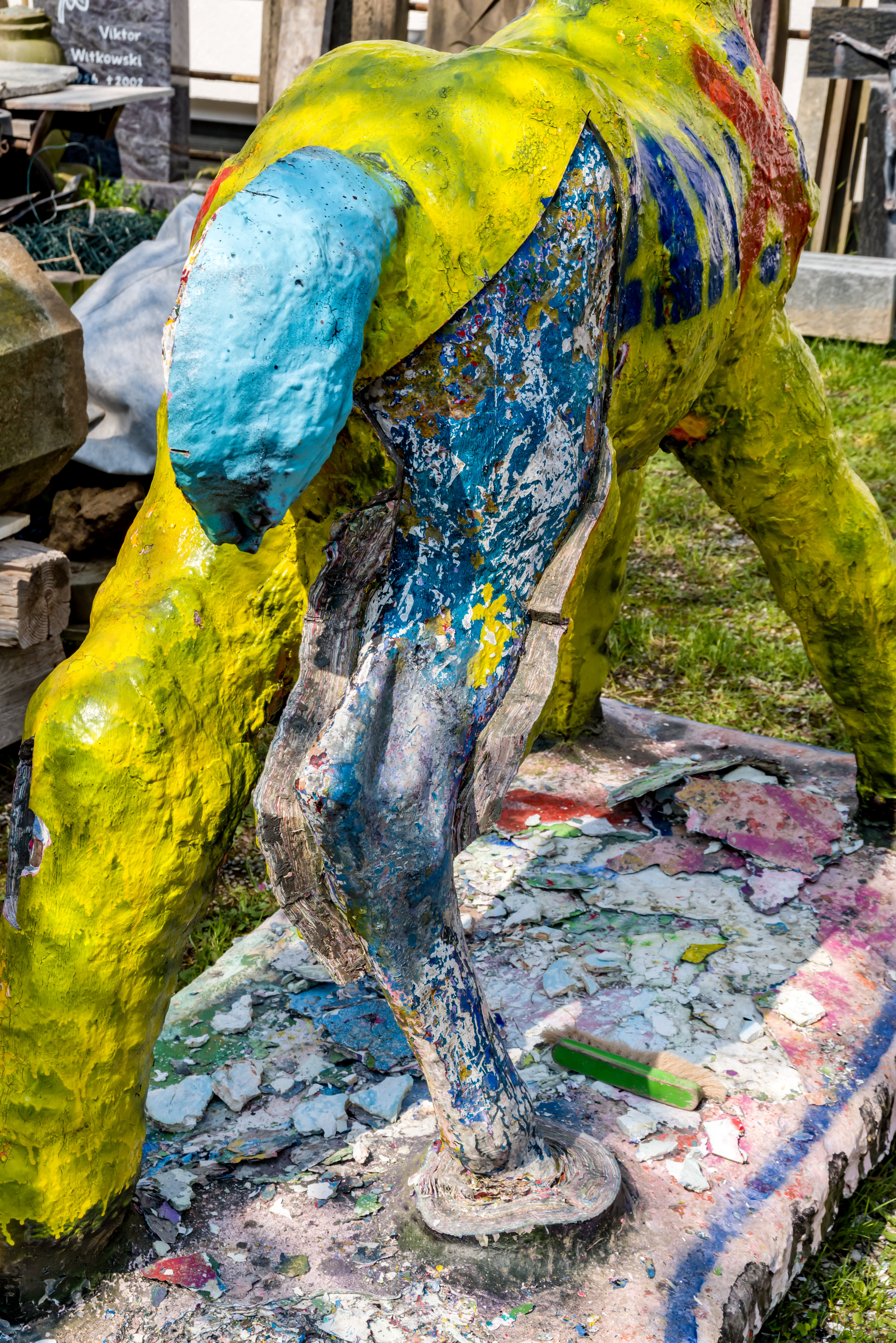
current state of the restoration, mid April 2019

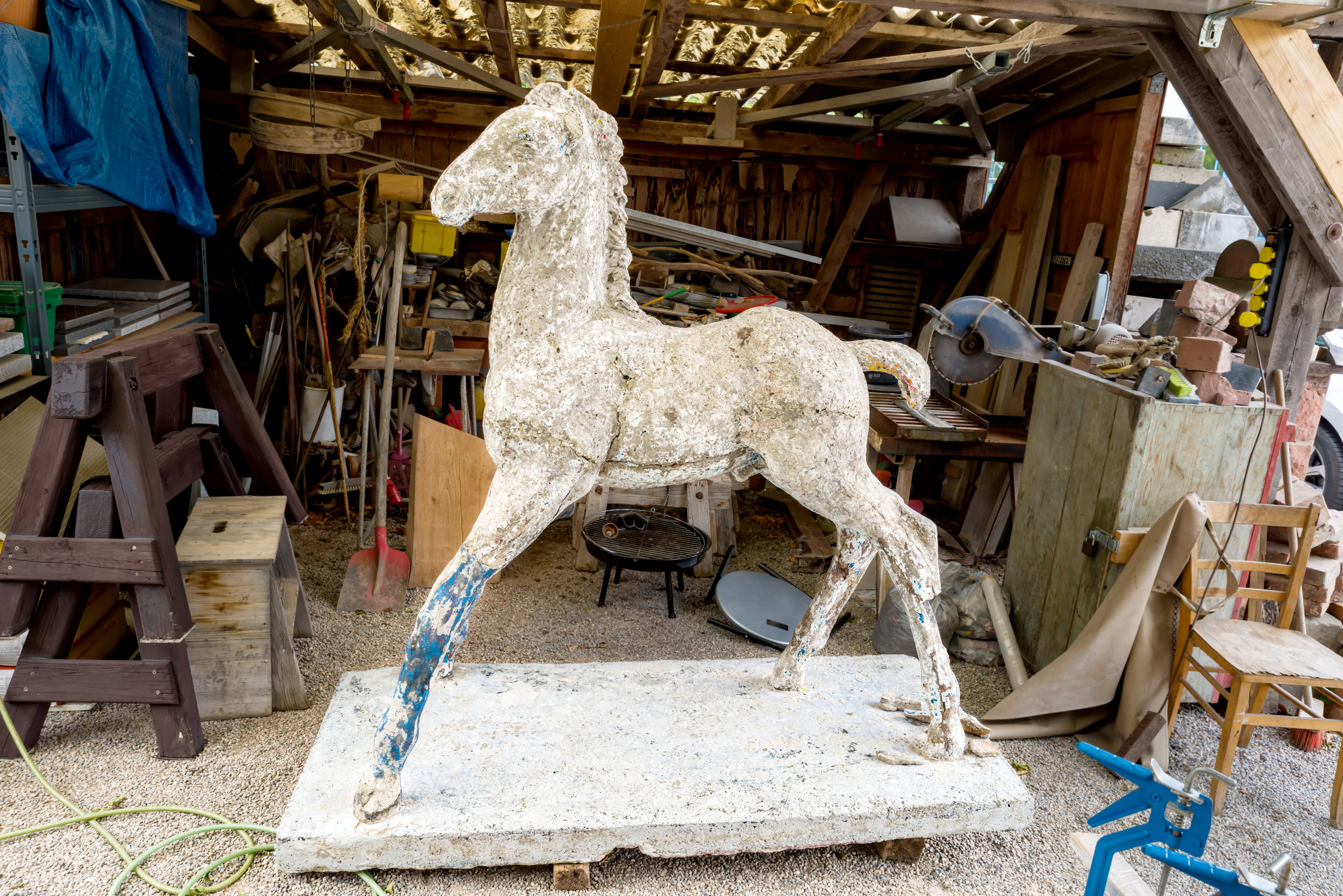
all paint layers removed on May 14 2019. the foal is once again lean and lifelike, as intended by the artist

Holbeinpferd or Holbeinpferdle (German: horse with the alemannic diminutive ending ‑le) is the local name of a horse sculpture in Freiburg im Breisgau in the Wiehre district. It is known for its many anonymous alterations. The official name of the sculpture is „Stehendes Fohlen aus Betonguss“ (German: foal made of cast concrete, standing).

The cast concrete foal was made by sculptor Werner Gürtner in 1936. It is 1.90m tall and long, weighs approximately one metric ton and is owned by the city of Freiburg. It was erected at its location on a small patch of grass between its namesake street Holbeinstraße, Hans-Thoma-Straße and Günterstalstraße in the 1950s (Tramline 2 to Günterstal, stop "Holbeinstraße").

== Description ==
Since the early 1970s, unknown individuals have carefully painted and decorated the sculpture over and over again. At first, this only happened at night but there have since been cases during the day. Here, one intends to creatively illustrate a certain topic. The rising media interest tempted more unknown people to redecorate the little horse at increasing frequencies. The idea to customize a sculpture is probably inspired by the Manneken Pis in Brussels, that has been honored like this since the 17th century and which is now in the hands of an official guardian.

One of the first and, at the same time, longest lasting paintings transformed the little horse into a zebra. Since then, its appearance has changed more and more frequently. The Holbeinhorse has already been an unofficial advertisement medium (e. g. Milka, Nivea, UHU), ambassador of political messages (Brent-Spar-Boykott) and messenger of love confessions; it has worn different flagpatterns, jerseys of football clubs, cycling teams, as well as Unicorn- and Pegasus applications. In 2003, the horse functioned as the donkey of the Town Musicians of Bremen, carrying the other animals, and it got veiled in 1995 on occasion of the Wrapped Reichstag by Christo and Jeanne-Claude. In the early the 1990s, postcard and photo series of the horse in its various colorings were published and it was reported on on TV.

== Early history ==
In 1936 the sculpture, which had not yet been signed, was sold to Walter Cordes, who later resold it to the department responsible for the environment and parks in Freiburg. On May 28th 1951 it was installed in the Holbeinstraße. Walter Corde's nephew, a veterinarian, had provided Gürtner the foal he used as a model. At the current mayor's request, Wolfgang Hoffman, Werner Günter added his signature in the 1950s. Hoffman also ordered inspections because of children repeatedly riding the horse in its early days. In 1954, it was painted a dull brown which lead to widespread discontent. The horse was restored three times throughout the 1980s and painted brown in accordance with Gürtner's wishes in 1978. This coat of paint did not last long – the horse was repeatedly repainted by unknown individuals. On March 29th 1990 the sculpture was knocked off its base by a car.

== Legal Battle on Postcards ==
The community of joint heirs around Elsa Gürtner, the sculptors widow, sued for the revenue generated by photographer Matthias Wolpert through photographs and postcards of the Holbeinpferd to be published. The lawsuit with a jurisdictional amount of DM10.000,- was denied by the district court of Freiburg in 1996, the reason being that photographs of sculptures can legally be used commercially if the sculpture is situated in a public space (Freedom of Panorama). The plaintiffs appealed the decision and in 1997 the district court of Mannheim confirmed the prior verdict for the most part. However, the plaintiffs desire for publication of the records was granted. (LG Mannheim 14. Februar 1997, 7 S 4/96 „Freiburger Holbein-Pferd“, GRUR 1997, 364).

A verdict against the photographer was reached only because he used image editing to give the statue an appearance that it never really had (a Saint Nicholas costume). The court reiterated that the legitimacy of the use of a work according to § 59 UrhG does not become unapplicable because third parties changed the original. Circulating photographs where the appearance of a work has been tampered with however is a violation of fair use laws.

== Cleaning ==
In the beginning the city had the sculpture cleaned in 1981, 1985 and 1987. Its final cleaning was done by a stonemason firm using a pressure washer in 1997 and paid for by photographer Matthis Wolpert. Since then the sculpture has been covered in layer after layer of paint, gradually becoming more misshapen.

== Restoration ==
On February 20th 2019 the sculpture was demounted so the layers of paint could be removed by hand at the Freiburg stonemason's workshop Hellstern. The horse was only returned to its place on June 3rd 2019 due to the restoration taking longer than expected.

During the restoration process approximately 180kg of paint, plaster and other materials were removed from the sculpture. The non-paint materials like plaster, newspaper and wallpaper contributed particularly heavily to the damages as they lead to the sculpture being kept moist. The removal of the outer layer took place in two steps. First the paint was roughly removed using an oscillating saw. Then the last layers were taken off with a high-pressure steam cleaner. After that it became apparent that the damage to the sculpture was significantly worse than expected. The legs in particular had to undergo intensive restoration, as the internal iron square reinforcement had taken damage and had to be freed from rust completely. During this process a part of the concrete had to be removed and joined back together with epoxy afterward. To finalize the restoration the sculpture received a protective coat of paint. The restoration efforts took more than 80 hours of work in total. The cost of €6.500 was paid by the Strather family and the city of Freiburg.

The city does not intend to condone the painting going forward. The day after the statue was returned to its place it had already been painted once more, this time with the Danish flag.

== Miscellaneous ==
Artistic freedom is a fundamental right in Germany which is protected by Article 5 Paragraph 3 of the German constitution.

The manipulation of photographs can be art, or rather is often perceived as art. Well known examples include the alterations Andy Warhol made to photographs of Marilyn Monroe.

Today image editing refers to something different than at the time of the aforementioned ruling, specifically pixel-level editing on a computer. Back then, technical adjustments to photographs were made during the developing process in a photographic laboratory. This could, for example, affect the image’s sharpness, brightness, and/or color.

There is a slightly altered model of the horse made from synthetic resin that can be purchased for people to paint on themselves nowadays.

== The little horse as a vehicle for art ==
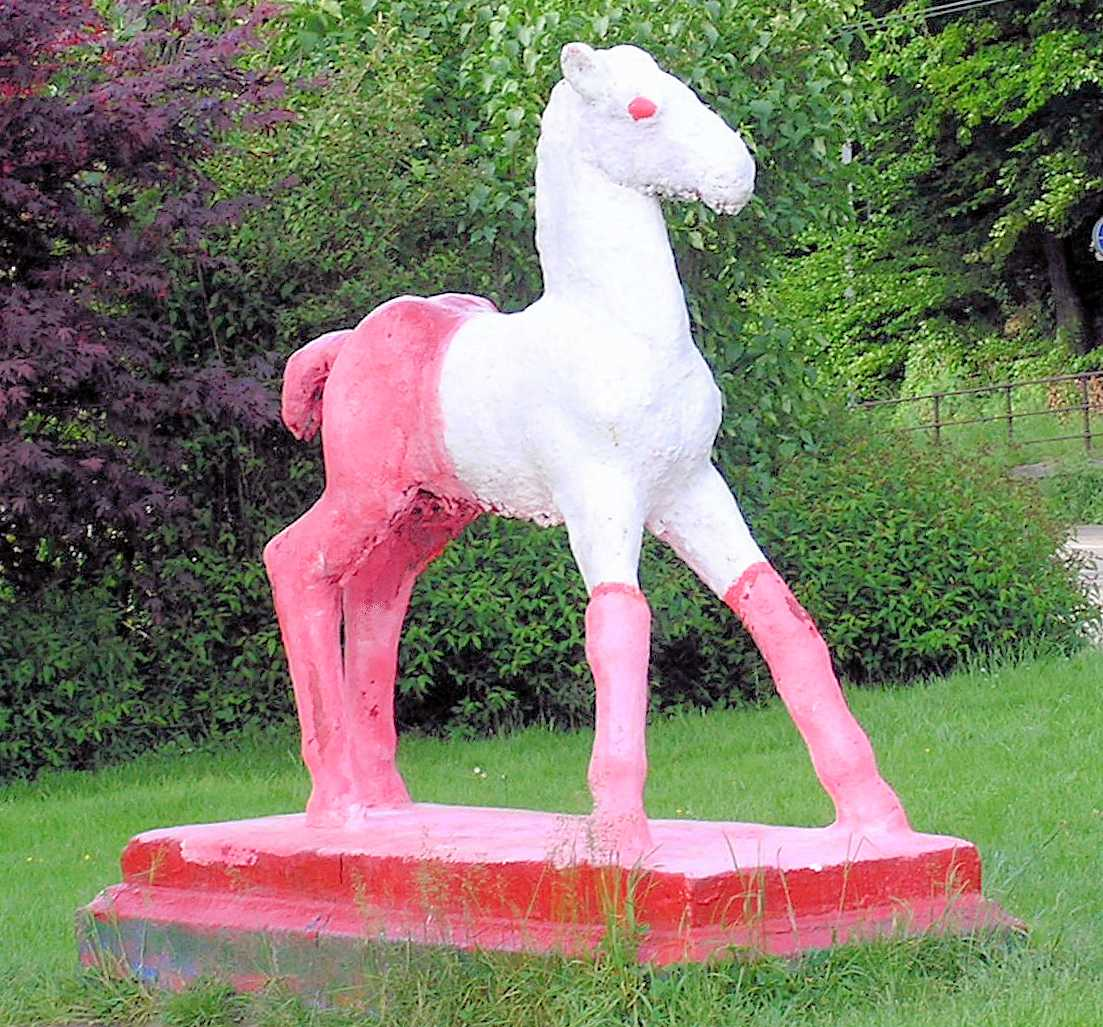
May 21st 2006

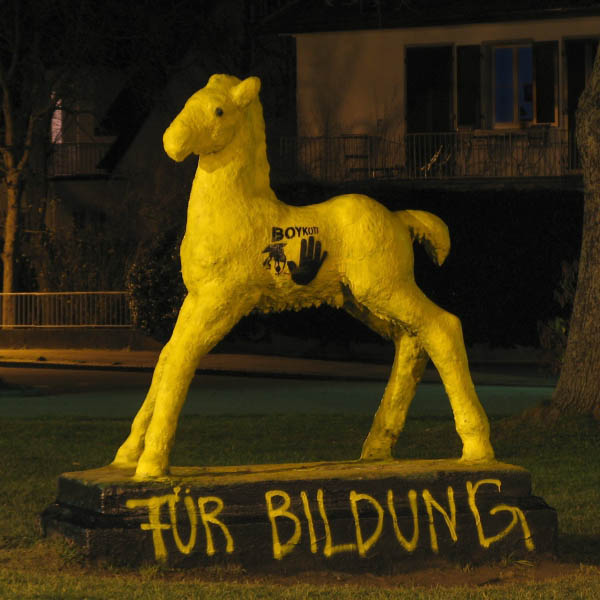
January 2007

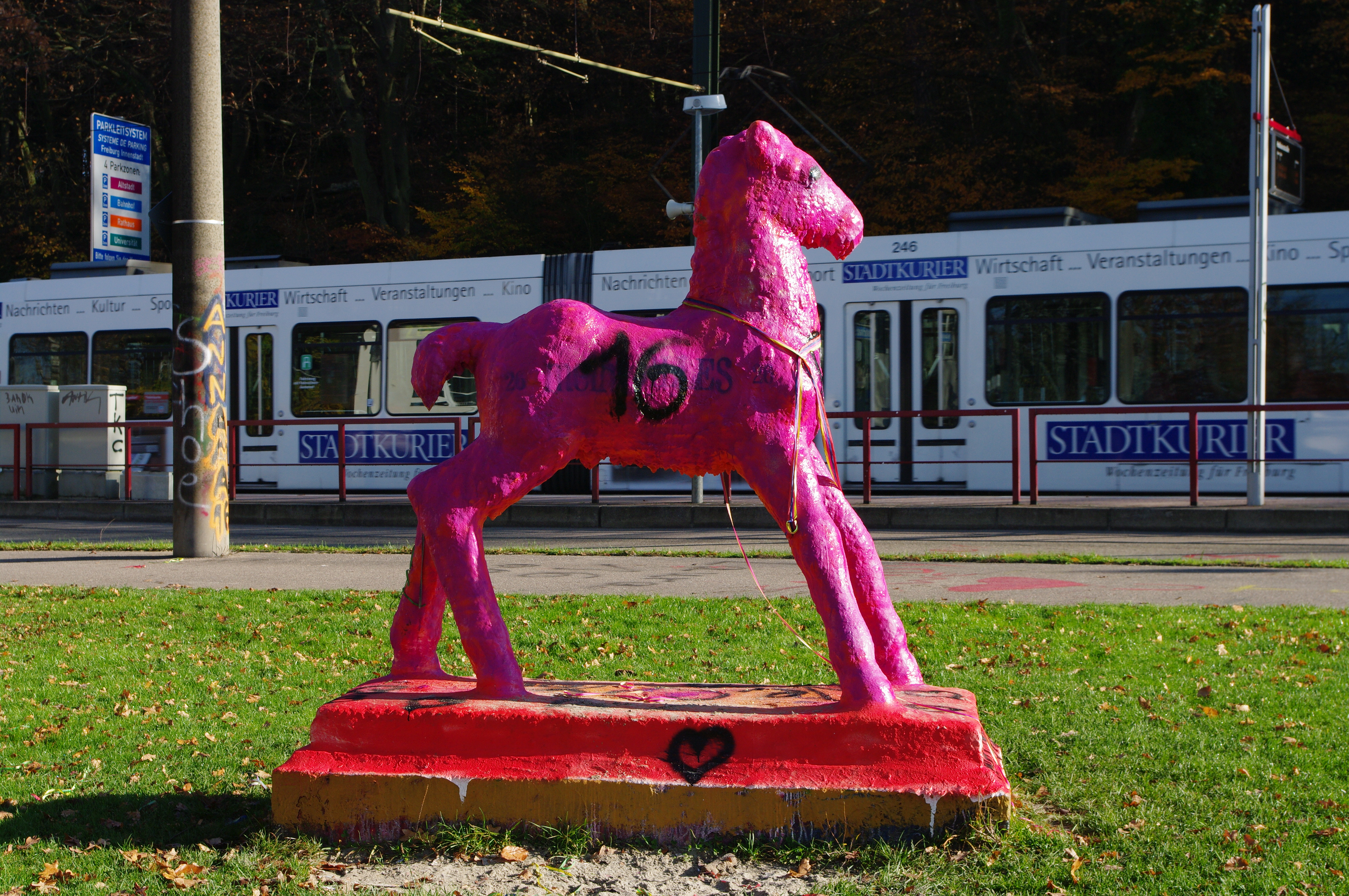
November 15th 2008

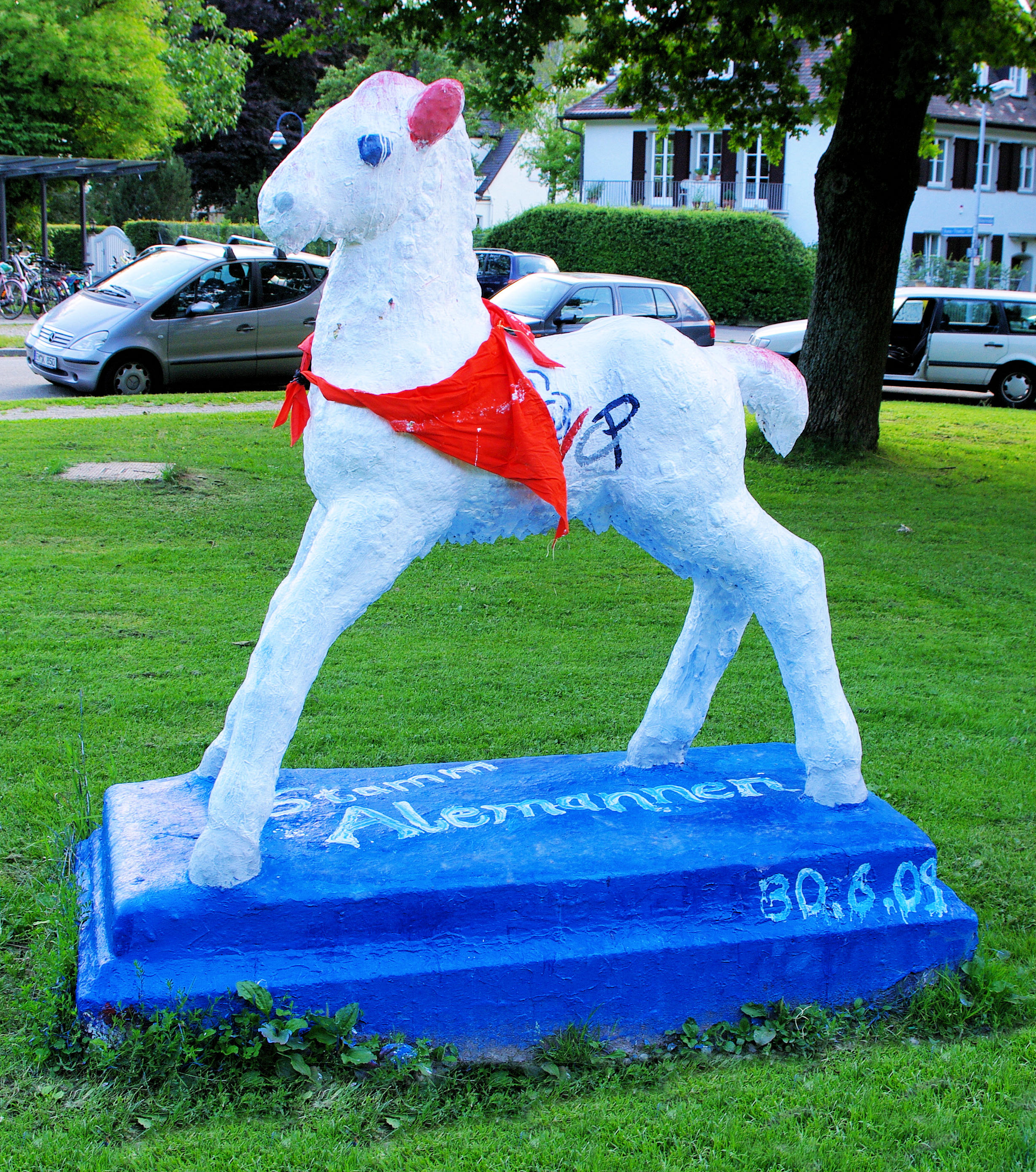
July 2009

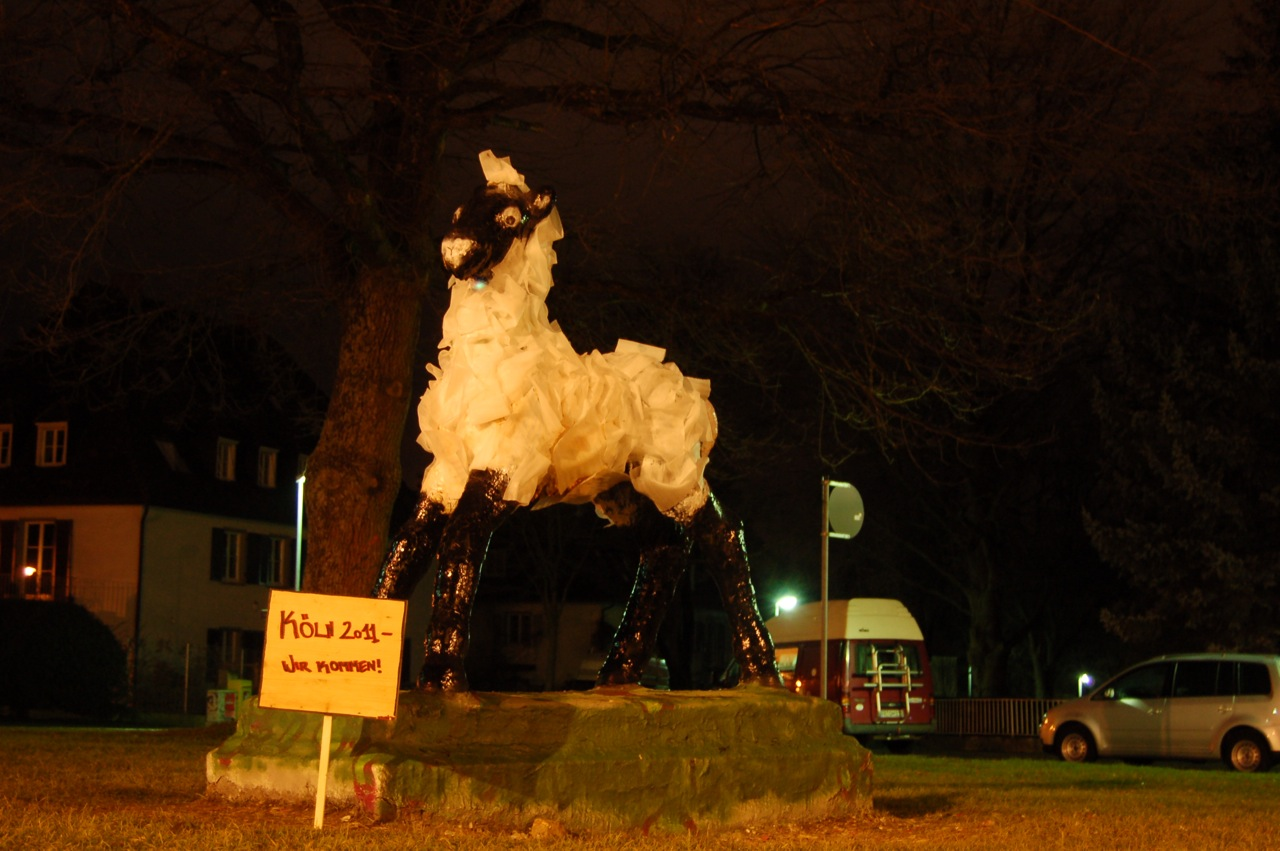
As a sheep, February 2010

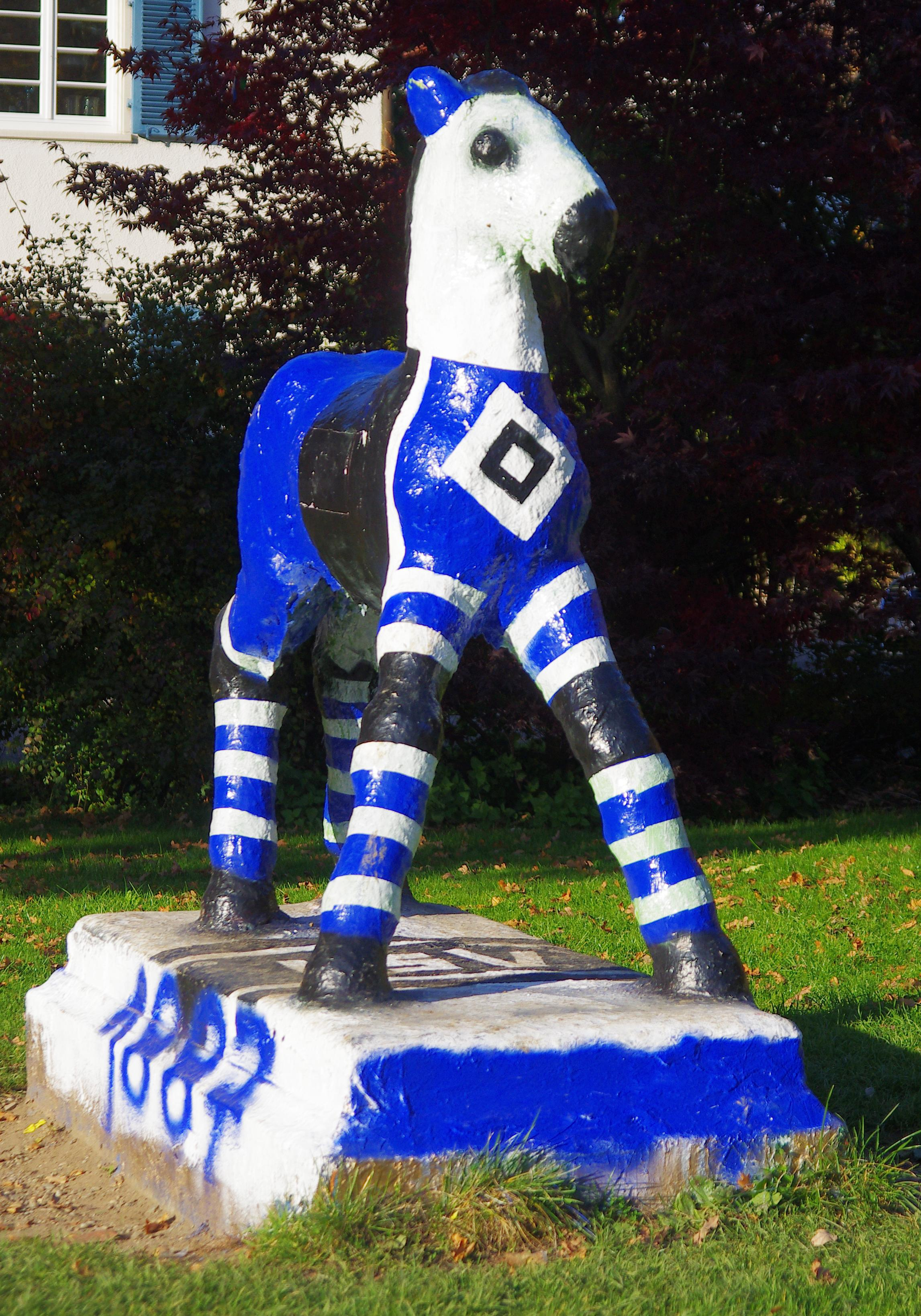
November 2011

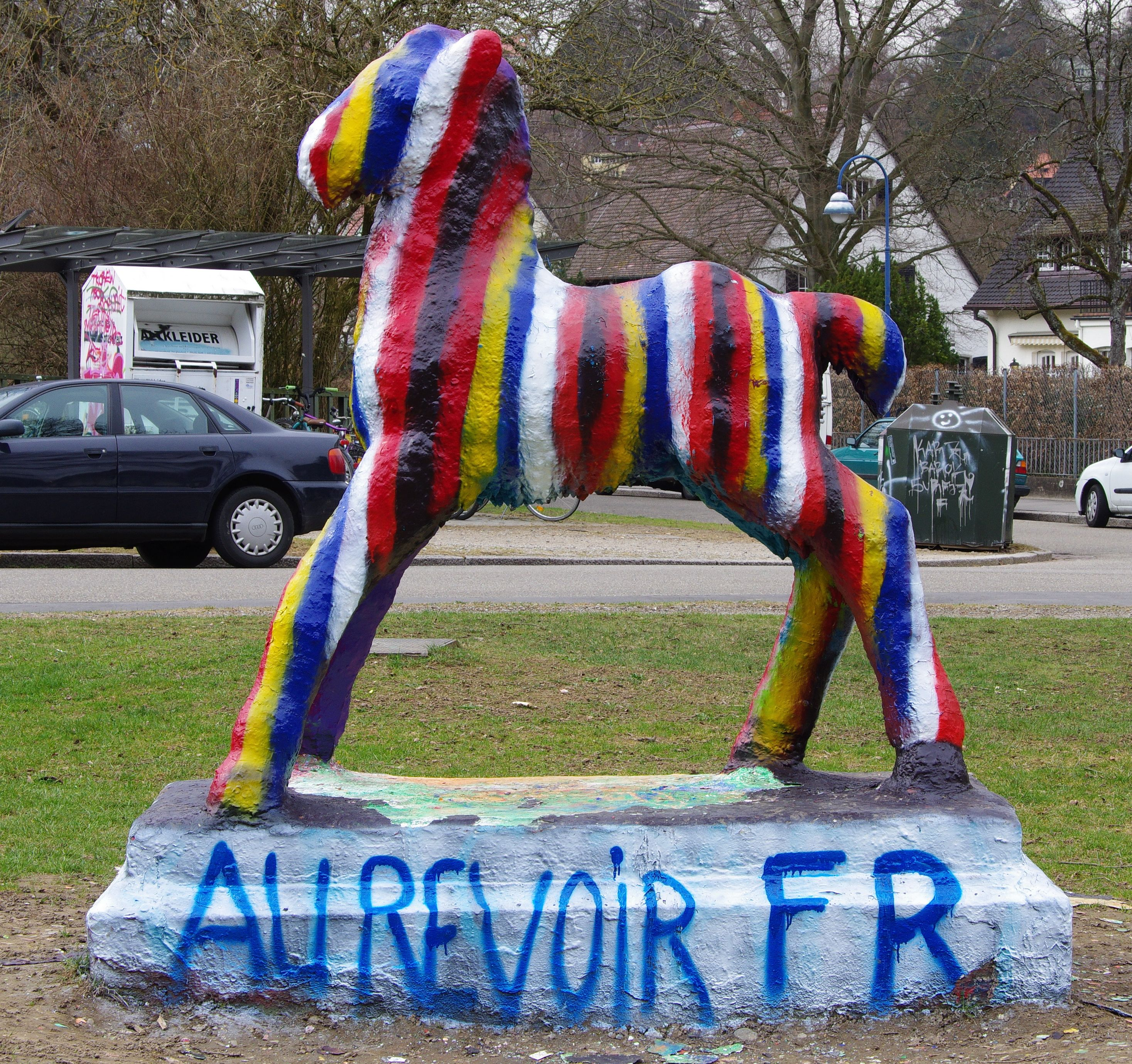
March 17th 2012

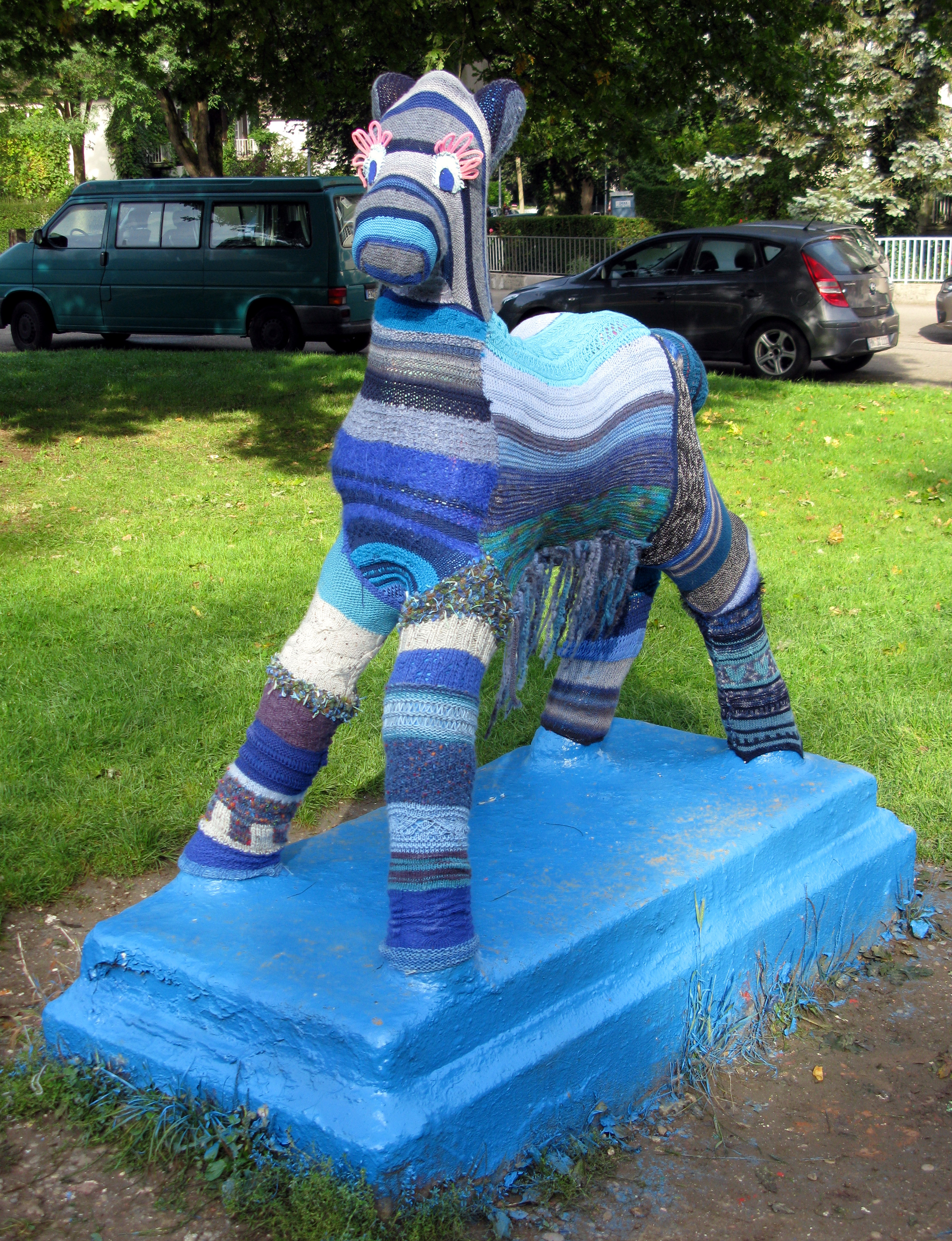
Yarn bombing, September 2013

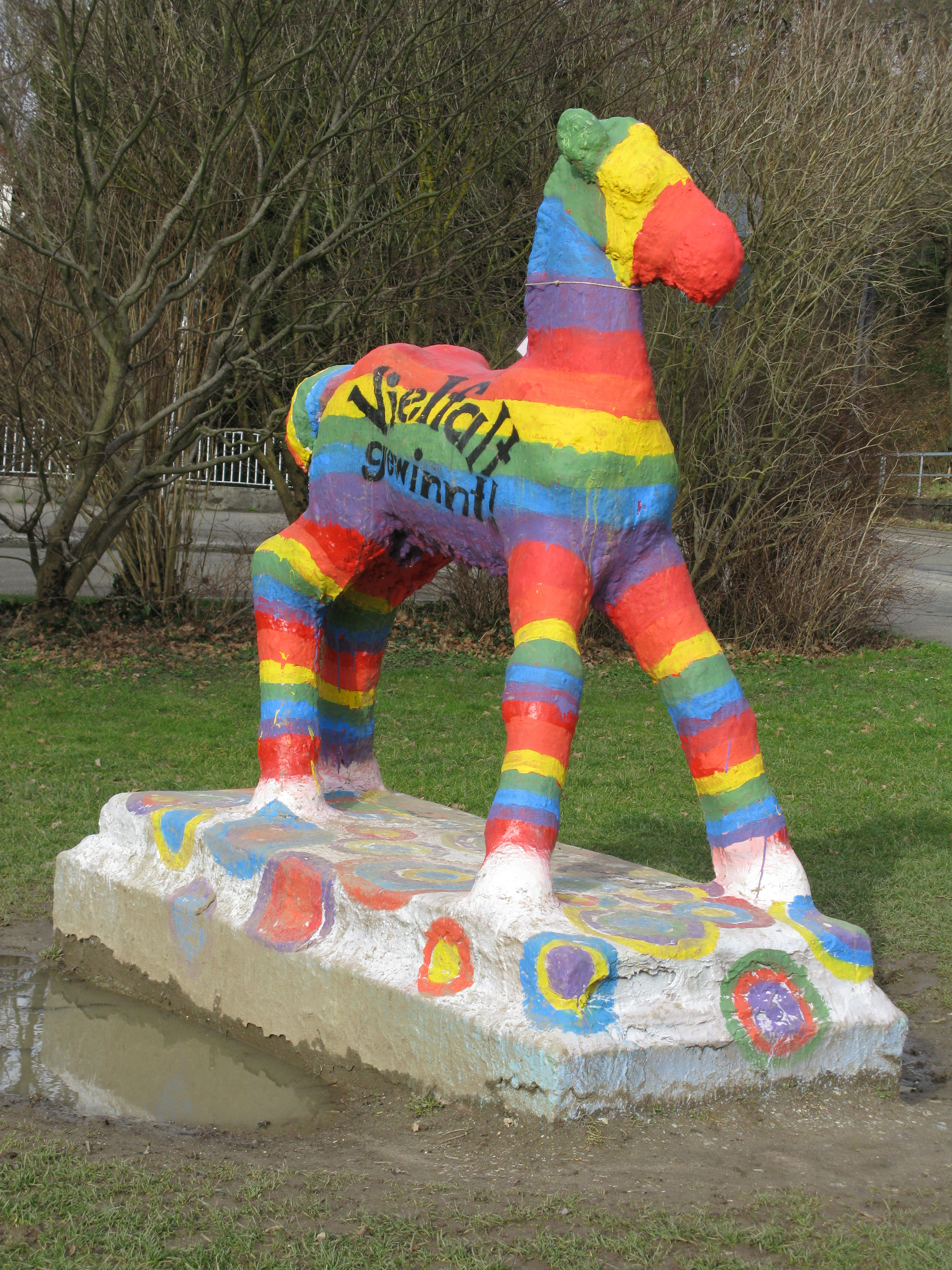
In rainbow colors as a symbol for the planned curriculum for tolerance and sexual diversity in schools, February 2014

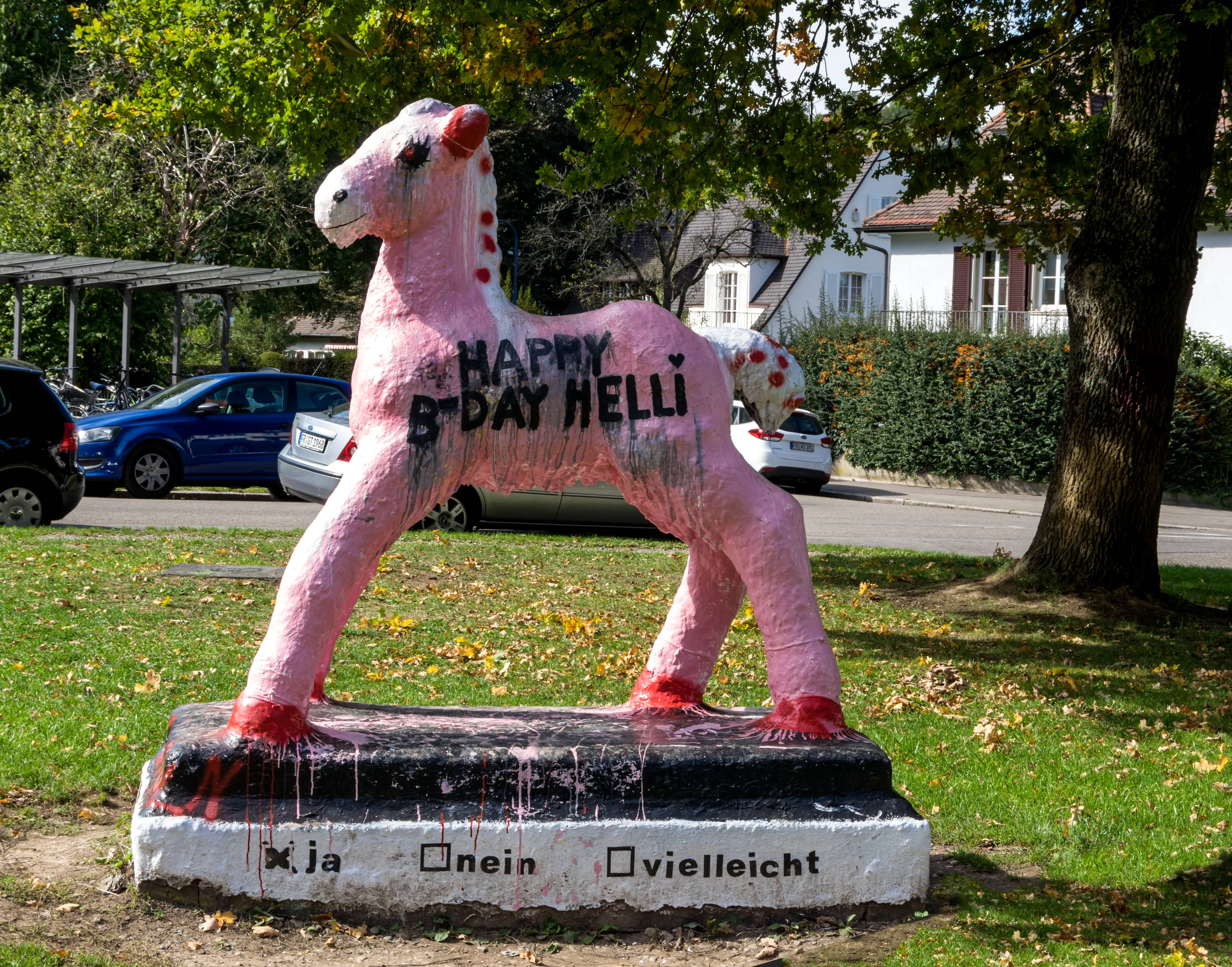
September 2015

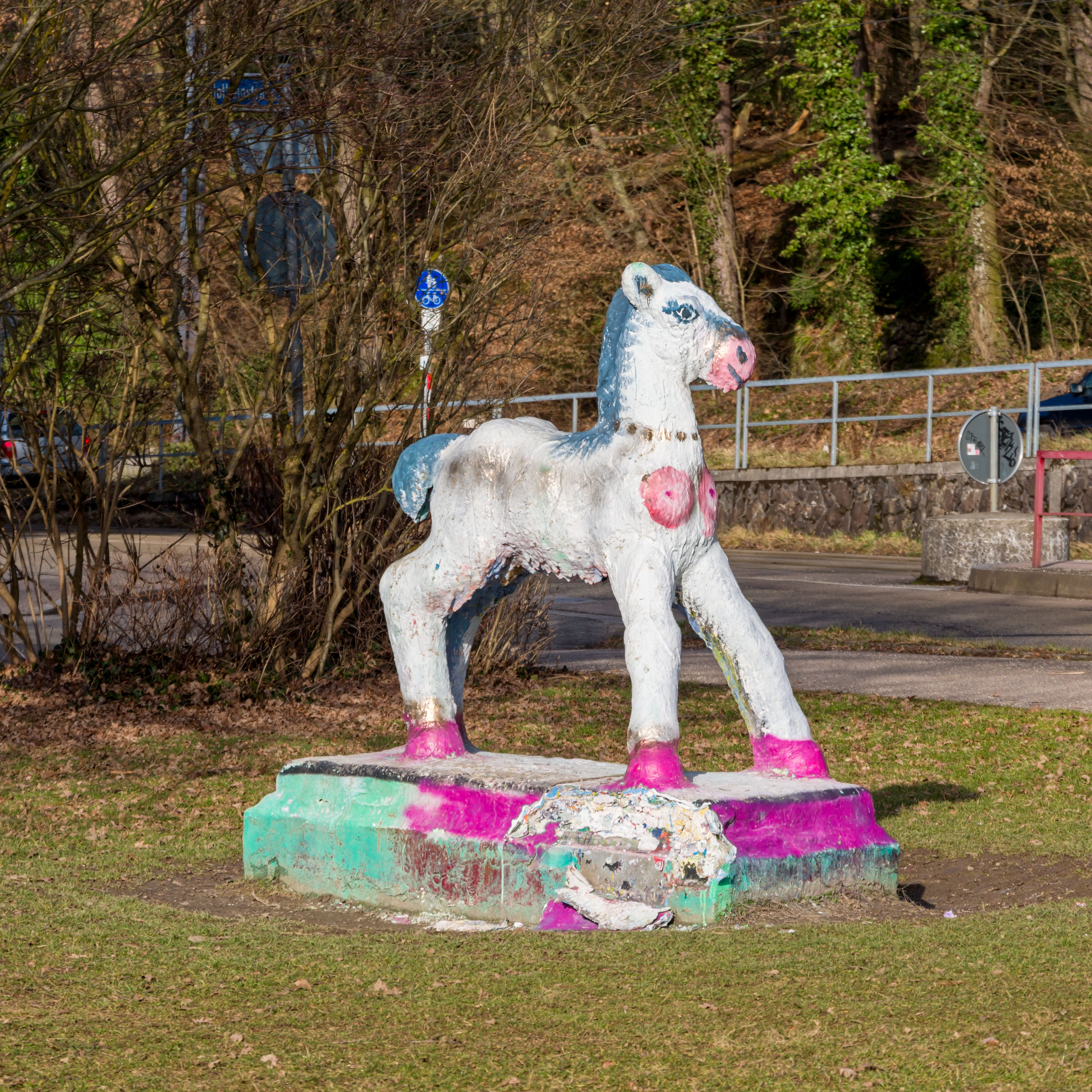
February 2017

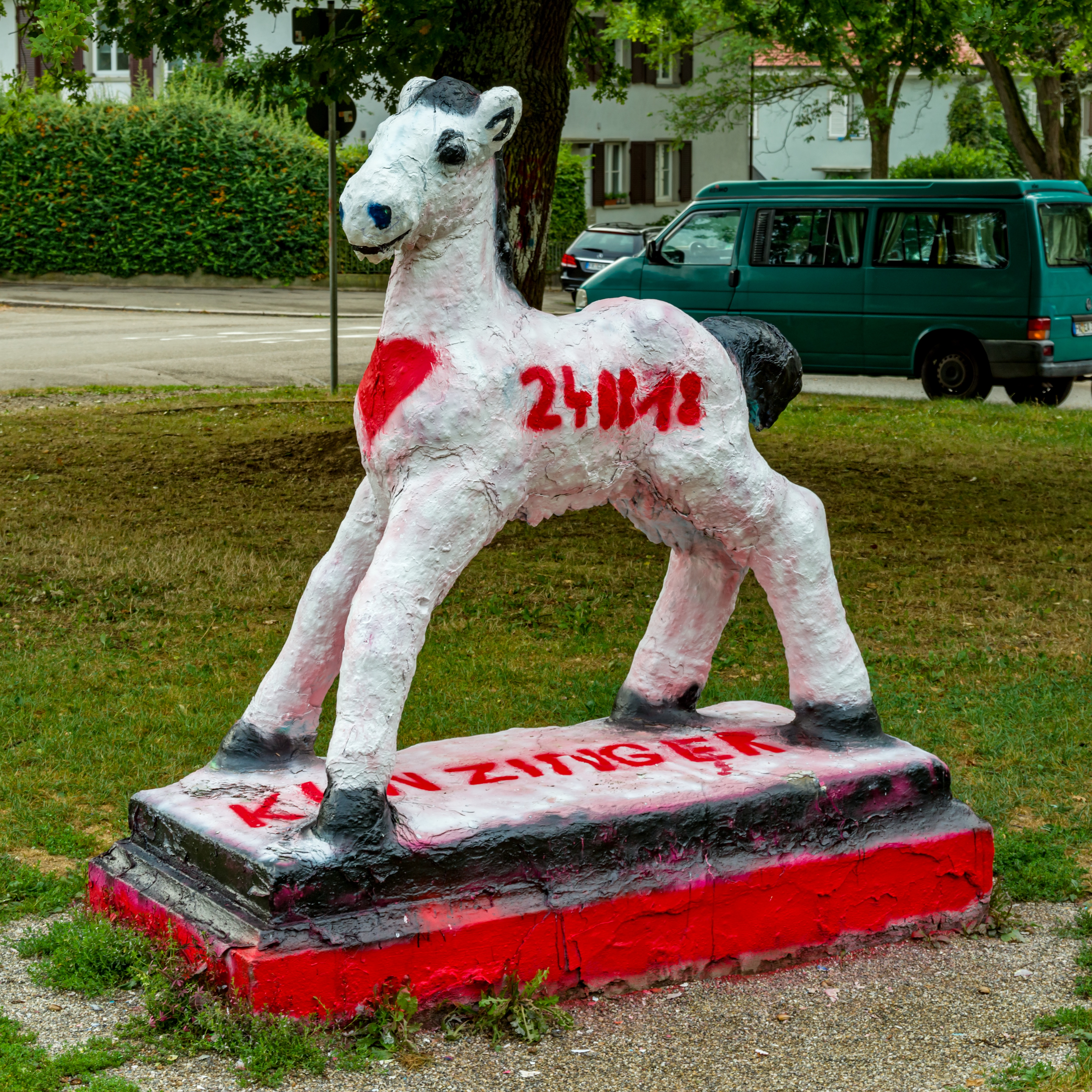
August 2018

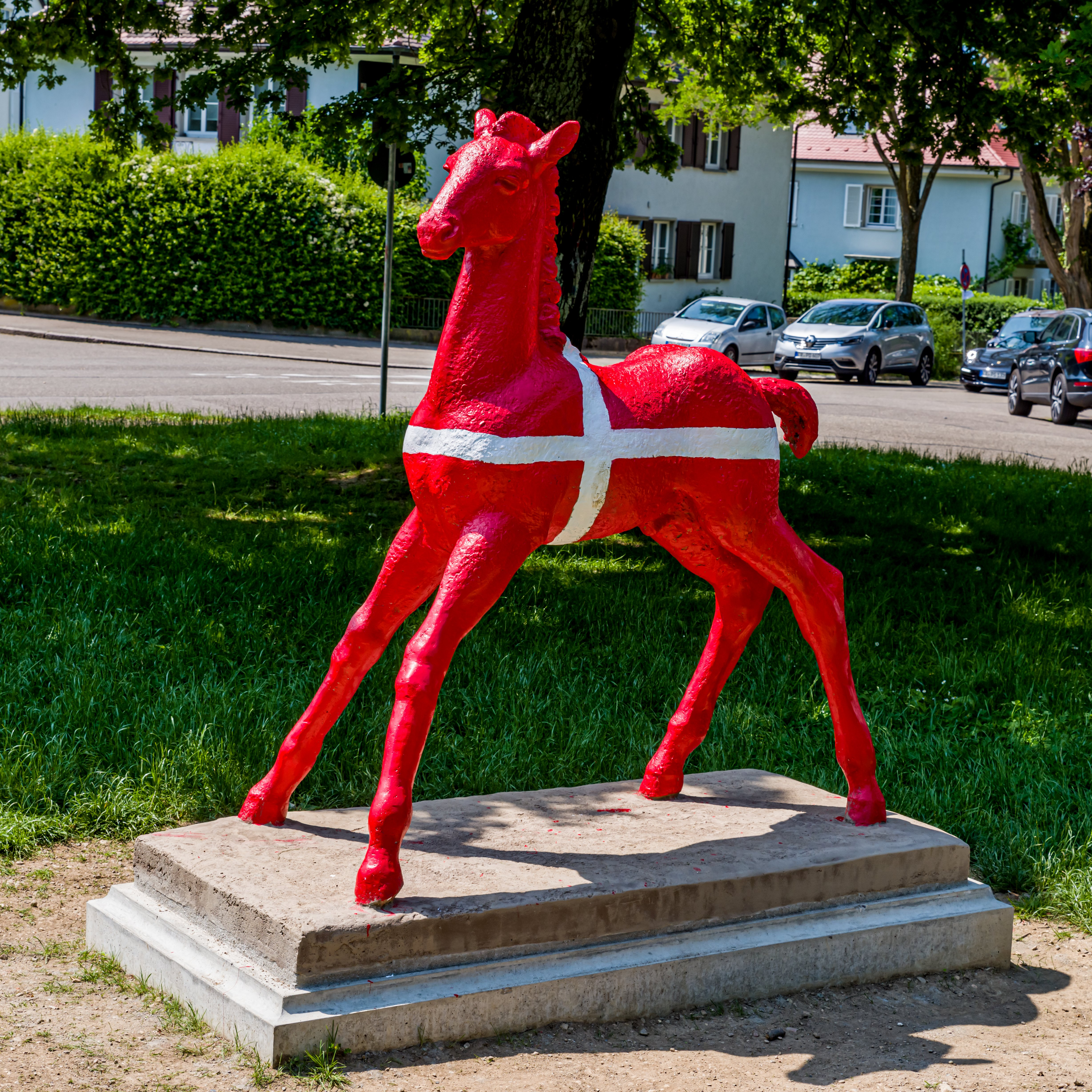
4th of June 2019, first day after the restoration

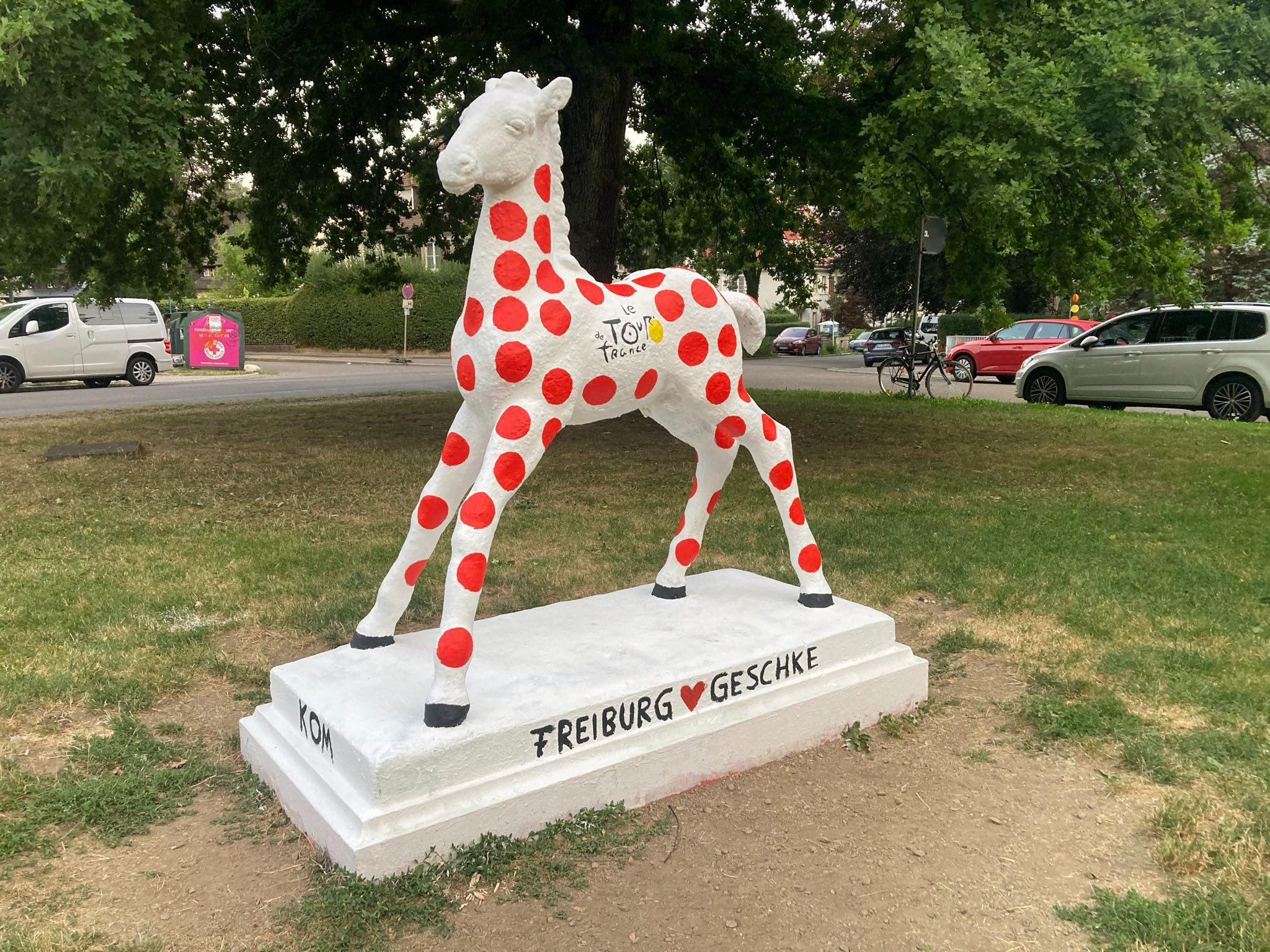
Tour de France 2022

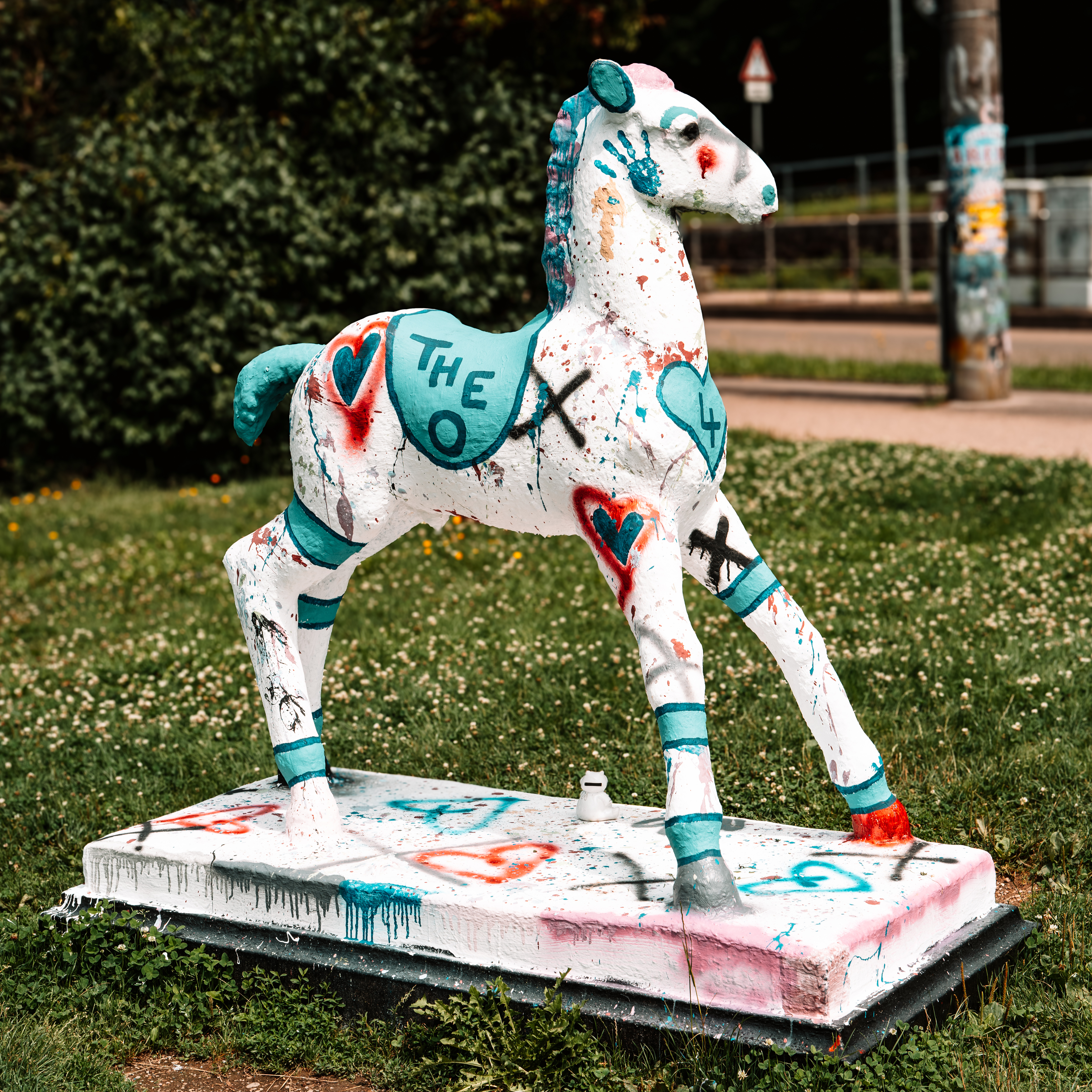
July 2025

== Weblinks ==
- Website about the horse
- Video: This is how the horse is removed from its base and restored Patrick Kerber, Badische Zeitung. February 21st 2019, accessed on February 23rd 2019
- Blog on the painting since 2006
