= John West (captain) =

Scottish businessman

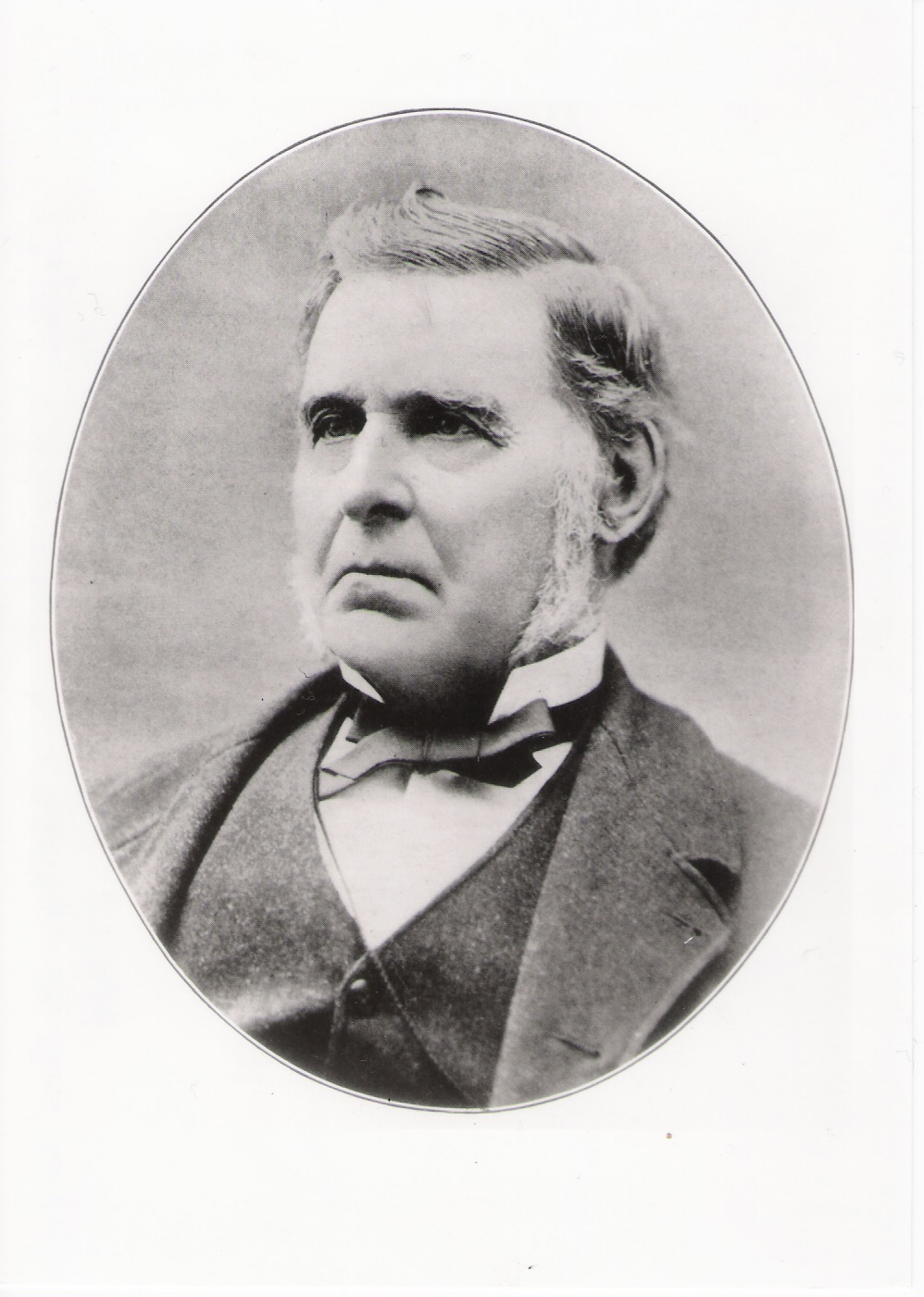
- Born: January 8, 1809; Linlithgow, Scotland
- Died: December 27, 1888 (aged 79); Westport, Oregon
- Other name: Captain John West
- Occupations: Millwright, Exporter
- Known for: Founder of Westport, Oregon

John West (1809–1888) was a Scottish inventor and businessman who emigrated to Canada, California and later Oregon where he operated a cannery and exported tuna to Great Britain.

The Pelling Stanley and Company in the UK imported his tuna and paid for the rights to use his name, which led to the establishment of the use of "John West" as a brand name.

== Biography ==
Born in 1809, John West immigrated to Quebec, Canada where he married and started a family while apprenticing as a millwright. In 1849, he left his family and job to search for gold in California. A year later, with little gold to show for his efforts, he arrived in Astoria, Oregon and went to work using his knowledge as a millwright.

In 1853, West and his wife Margaret took up a 640-acre (2.6 km^{2}) Donation Land Claim along the lower Columbia River upon which he soon began construction of a water-powered sawmill. West built a steam-powered sawmill in the early 1860s, and by 1868, he was exporting lumber to Australia. During these years, the community of Westport grew up around John West's sawmill on his Donation Land Claim.

The West family sold the mill in the early 1900s. The Westport Lumber Company continued production there until February 1956, when it became uneconomical to operate the mill because of a scarcity of logs sufficient in size.

John West also exported salmon from as early as 1857. The first fish West processed were salted, packed in barrels, then shipped to California, where they were loaded on sailing ships and sent around Cape Horn to East Coast ports, and then on to Great Britain. In 1868, West, in partnership with others, founded the Westport Cannery, the first on the Oregon shore of the Columbia River. The cannery packed 22,000 cases of salmon during the 1873 season and in October of that year won a gold medal from the Oregon Agricultural Society, in a competition that was the genesis for the Oregon State Fair. Salmon canning peaked in the 1880s with 39 canneries in 1883, supported by 1,700 commercial fishing boats along the Columbia River.

West invented an automated can-filing machine and was the first on the lower Columbia River to make use of salmon waste for oil and fishmeal by-products. He also experimented with canning beef, mutton, and blackberries to keep the machinery and workers busy during the salmon off season. West's brand label for canned foods lives on today as John West Foods of Liverpool, England, which markets canned fish, fruit, vegetables, and meat all over the world.

"Captain" John West died in 1888 at the age of 79 and is buried in the West family plot at the Westport Cemetery.

== Commemoration ==
An Oregon Historical Marker was erected on July 14, 2009 at Bradley State Scenic Viewpoint near Westport, Oregon commemorating John West and Westport, Oregon. Bryan C. Aalberg, fourth great-grandson of "Captain" John West is credited with creation of the marker.
