= King Oscar (company) =

Norwegian canned seafood company

- Product type: Sardines, salmon, mackerel, herring, anchovies, tuna, cod, and other specialty canned seafood
- Current owner: Thai Union Group
- Country: Norway
- Markets: Norway, United States, Canada, Poland, Czech Republic, Slovakia, Hungary, Romania, Belgium, Germany, Japan, Singapore, China, Australia, South Africa.
- Website: www.kingoscar.com

The King Oscar export brand was founded in 1902 when King Oscar II, ruler of Sweden and Norway, gave Chr. Bjelland & Co – one of Norway's leading canning companies at the time, "special royal permission" to use his name and likeness on a line of sardine products.

Over the years, the King Oscar brand expanded into new markets, introduced new product lines, and was eventually acquired by several different parent companies as the sardine canning industry evolved in Norway. Since 2014, King Oscar AS has been owned by Thai Union Group, one of the largest seafood producers in the world.

== History ==
In 1880, Norwegian fish canneries began exporting sardines. At the World's Fair in Chicago in 1893, the Norwegian exhibition included smoked sardines.

In 1903, a year after royal permission had been granted, Chr. Bjelland & Co. first began exporting the King Oscar brand of sardines to the United States, and by 1920, the brand was established in the USA and British markets. In 1965, the company started exporting their sardines to Japan.

Chr. Bjelland & Co. produced a ten-minute film called "Sardine fishing" in 1909 to market the brand; this was the first Norwegian commercial. The company also used the slogan "Out to conquer the world."

In 1950, various King Oscar brisling sardine products were accorded kosher certification.

In 1981, eleven Norwegian canneries merged to form a single company, Norway Foods, which acquired the King Oscar brand. Norway Foods was in turn acquired by Rieber & Søn ASA in 1996. Over the following years, the brand was introduced to various western and eastern European countries, select countries in Asia, to Australia, and South Africa.

In 2008, King Oscar's central production facilities were moved to a company-owned facility in Gniewino, Poland. The company continues to maintain a production facility in Svolvær, Norway.

King Oscar AS became the new owner of the brand in 2009. The company was purchased by Procuritas Capital Investments in 2010, and by Thai Union Group in 2014.

== Products ==
While brisling sardines have always been the company's flagship product, King Oscar produces a widening variety of seafood products. For the USA, the product range includes brisling sardines, skinless & boneless sardines, salmon, mackerel, kipper snacks or traditionally smoked herring, and anchovies. In other parts of the world, the product range includes tuna, cod, and other specialty items, as well as fish salads and fish pâtés.
