= Bolton Group =

Italian commercial conglomerate

- Company type: S.r.l.
- Industry: Consumer goods
- Founded: 1949 in Milan, Italy
- Founder: Joseph Nissim
- Headquarters: Milan, Italy
- Area served: Worldwide
- Key people: Marina Nissim (Chairwoman); Roberto Leopardi (CEO)
- Revenue: €3.5 billion (2025)
- Net income: €210.8 million (2016)
- Number of employees: >10,600 (2025)
- Website: www.bolton.com

The Bolton Group is an Italian multinational company that produces and sells consumer goods, with the headquarter based in Milan, Italy.

The group's portfolio includes around 60 brands in the food (canned fish and meat, sauces), home care, personal care, adhesives and cosmetics sectors. As of 2025, the group employs about 11,000 people distributed across 55 offices, 17 production sites, 10 research and development laboratories and 11 fishing vessels worldwide.

== History ==
The origins of the Bolton group date back to the creation of Exportex, a distribution company focused on consumer goods, primarily imports. The company was founded in Milan in 1949 by Joseph Nissim, a Greek-born Jewish immigrant to Italy. Born in 1919, Nissim fled Thessaloniki when the Nazis invaded Greece. After escaping, he joined the British Army and fought with distinction at the battle of El Alamein. In 1947, he moved to Italy.

Over the years, the business evolved into one of the largest Italian distribution companies for domestic and foreign consumer goods producers; Exportex was the exclusive distributor in Italy for foreign companies and brands, such as the American Procter & Gamble and Kimberly-Clark (personal care), and the British Beecham Group (pharmaceutical products).

In 1960 Nissim acquired ICIS (Industria Carni in Scatola Italian for "Canned Meat Industry"), a client company of Exportex based in Cermenate that produced canned meat under the Manzotin brand. Renamed Trinity Alimentari in 1965, it diversified its activity with the launch of canned tuna production under the brand Rio Mare, which would become the company’s flagship.

By 1971 Exportex was present throughout Italy with branches and warehouses in Bari, Bologna, Catania, Florence, Oristano, Naples, Padua, Pioltello, Rome and Turin. In the 1970s the company was also active in the chemical and household care sector through its subsidiary Nisco Chemical Italia. In 1978, Trinity began its international expansion with the marketing of Rio Mare tuna in Greece, laying the foundation for the subsequent creation of a Greek subsidiary.

Following the growth of the business, in 1978 a company named Bolton Group B.V. was established in Amsterdam, whose reference shareholder was Nissim. In 1980 the Milan branch was opened and in 1981 Bolton took control of Exportex and Trinity.

The newly established group also took control of a 49% stake in Beecham Italia, of which Nissim was CEO, a subsidiary of the British pharmaceutical multinational Beecham Group. The company operated in the Segrate plant, where it employed more than 200 workers, and produced personal care and hygiene products, including toothpaste under the Aquafresh brand. It was fully sold to Beecham in 1992.

Bolton increased its presence in the chemical sector with the 1982 acquisition of Manitoba Paper Italia, a subsidiary of Kimberly-Clark, based in Rome with a plant in Melzo, which produced paper and household and laundry care products. The company operated under the brands Fabello, Fornet, Glad, Intim, Kleenex, Kimbi, Kotex, Merito, Overlay, Sgorgo, TOT, Vitrexa, WC Net and Woolite. It was later renamed Manitoba Italia and its registered office was moved to Milan. Bolton established itself as the market leader in Italy in the canned tuna sector, in which in the 1980s it was present with the brands Rio Mare and Carlos Primero, with a 25% market share.

In 1986, through Trinity, the group acquired from the Benatoff family the SIE - Società Ittica Elbana S.r.l., a company based on the Elba island, producing canned sardines under the Napoleon brand, in which it was the national leader. Bolton’s expansion grew further in the 1990s, with the acquisition of other companies and brands such as the Italian Brill, Manetti & Roberts (1992), Collistar (1993), Lines diapers (1994), the German UHU (1994), the Spanish CILE (1996), the Dutch Bison (1996), the French Rogé Cavaillé (1998) and Saupiquet (1999), and the Greek Athens Papermill (2002).

In 2001 Bolton sold the diaper division of Lines to Kimberly-Clark Corporation, and expanded its international presence with new branches in Western Europe. Between 2003 and 2006, the group opened subsidiaries in Slovenia, Austria and Croatia, thus entering the markets of Eastern Europe. During the same period, the multinational also acquired the brands Kolmat (2004), Bostik (2006), Alco, Palmera, Petreet and Sanogyl (2007).

In 2012, the multinational carried out two major operations: it acquired 40% of the shares of Grupo Calvo, a Spanish canned fish producer that had controlled the Italian Nostromo since 1993; and purchased from the American company Kraft, for about €100 million, the canned meat brand Simmenthal, which held 67% of the Italian market. To avoid issues with the Antitrust, Bolton immediately put the Manzotin brand on the market; in 2013 it was acquired by the Genoese company Generale Conserve.

In 2015, Bolton acquired 75% of Conservas Garavilla from MCH and Investment Portfolio Dularr, a Basque company specializing in canned fish, with plants in Bilbao, Ecuador and Morocco. The remaining 25% was acquired in October 2016. In 2016, Bolton had €1.96 billion in revenue and €210.8 million in profits.

In 2018, Bolton announced the adoption of a more progressive tuna sourcing policy. Greenpeace had been critical of Bolton's sourcing practices.

In March 2019 Joseph Nissim died at the age of 100. In July of the same year, through its subsidiary Manetti & Roberts, Bolton acquired the entire share capital of Omia Laboratories, a company based in Cisterna di Latina, founded in 1997 by the Angioletti family and a leading player in the personal care sector. In the same month, Bolton also took control of the American company Tri Marine, which manages a global tuna supply chain and generates revenues of more than US$1.2 billion. Bolton had already acquired a minority stake in Tri Marine in 2013. With the full acquisition of Tri Marine, Bolton became the world’s second-largest operator in the sector, behind Thai Union Group.

As a result of the COVID-19 epidemic, sales of the Bolton Group’s canned seafood products increased in Europe in early 2020s.

In August 2021, Bolton acquired Wild Planet Foods, a company founded in 2004 that had become the leading producer of sustainable canned fish in the United States. In December of the same year, it announced the acquisition of the Madel Group of Cotignola.

In 2023, the group expanded further with the acquisition of Unipak A/S, a family-owned Danish company active in Northern Europe and the Baltic states in the sealant products market. In January 2025, Bolton enlarged its adhesives division with the acquisition of Repair Care, a Dutch company specializing in wood repair and maintenance products.

== Operations and subsidiaries ==
Bolton Group produces and markets consumer goods in more than 150 countries, operating in the food, personal and home care, adhesive and cosmetics sectors. It employs more than 11,000 people and owns 60 representative offices and 16 production plants (including 4 in Italy). In 2024 the company reported revenues of €3.5 billion. Of Bolton’s total revenues, 68.3% came from the food division, followed by home care (10.6%), personal care (7.8%), adhesives (9.2%) and cosmetics (4.1%).

=== Food ===
In the food sector the group produces and markets canned fish, canned meat and sauces. Bolton is considered a leading consolidator in the tuna and seafood industries. Among the largest companies in the canned fish sector in Italy (38% market share in 2016) and in Europe, the food division employed 9,000 people in 2024 and operated 10 production sites worldwide.

Rio Mare, launched by Bolton in the 1960s, produces its seafood products mainly in Cermenate. In 2017, the brand introduced an organic tuna line certified by the Marine Stewardship Council.

Part of Bolton's Food division is Tri Marine, which is one of the three largest global tuna traders along with FCF and Itochu. It is based in Bellevue, Washington and was founded in 1972. In 2019, Tri Marine was sold to the Bolton Group. The company has more than 5,000 employees and operates 16 purse-seiners. The French seafood brand Saupiquet is also included in the food division.

=== Home care ===
One of the group’s divisions produces and markets household and laundry detergents under various brands. In this sector, in 2022 the company employed 360 people and operated two production plants.

=== Adhesives ===
Bolton markets adhesives, glues, sealants, lubricants and welding products through several brands One of them is UHU, a German manufacturer of adhesive products.

=== Personal care ===
The group produces and markets soaps and personal hygiene products under various brands. In Italy the group operates in this sector through Manetti & Roberts, which manages a plant in Calenzano, in the Province of Florence.

=== Cosmetics ===
The company produces and markets a variety of cosmetics under different brands.

== Brands ==
As of 2025, Bolton Group owns the following brands.

=== Food ===
- Alamar
- Cardinal
- Cuca
- Isabel
- Massó
- Palmera
- Pécheurs de France
- Prima
- Rio Mare
- Sardines Robert
- Saupiquet
- Simmenthal
- Solomon Blue
- SolTuna
- Sustainable Seas
- Wild planet

=== Home Care ===
- Argentil
- Carolin
- Citrosil
- Deox
- Dubro
- Fornet
- Génie
- Meglio
- Merito
- Omino Bianco
- Ouragan
- Overlay
- Pulirapid
- Scel-o-Frais
- Sipuro
- SMAC
- Smacchio Tutto
- Solipro
- Vetril
- WC Net
- Winni's

=== Personal Care ===
- Acqua alle Rose
- Bilba
- Bilboa
- Borotalco
- Chilly
- Effervescente Brioschi
- Galeffi Effervescente
- Neutro Roberts
- Omia
- Sanogyl

=== Adhesives ===
- Air Max
- Bison
- Bostik
- Cyclon
- Griffon
- Repair Care
- UHU
- Unipak

=== Cosmetics ===
- Cavaillès
- Citrosil Hygiene
- Collistar
- Botot
