= Saupiquet =

French fish canning company

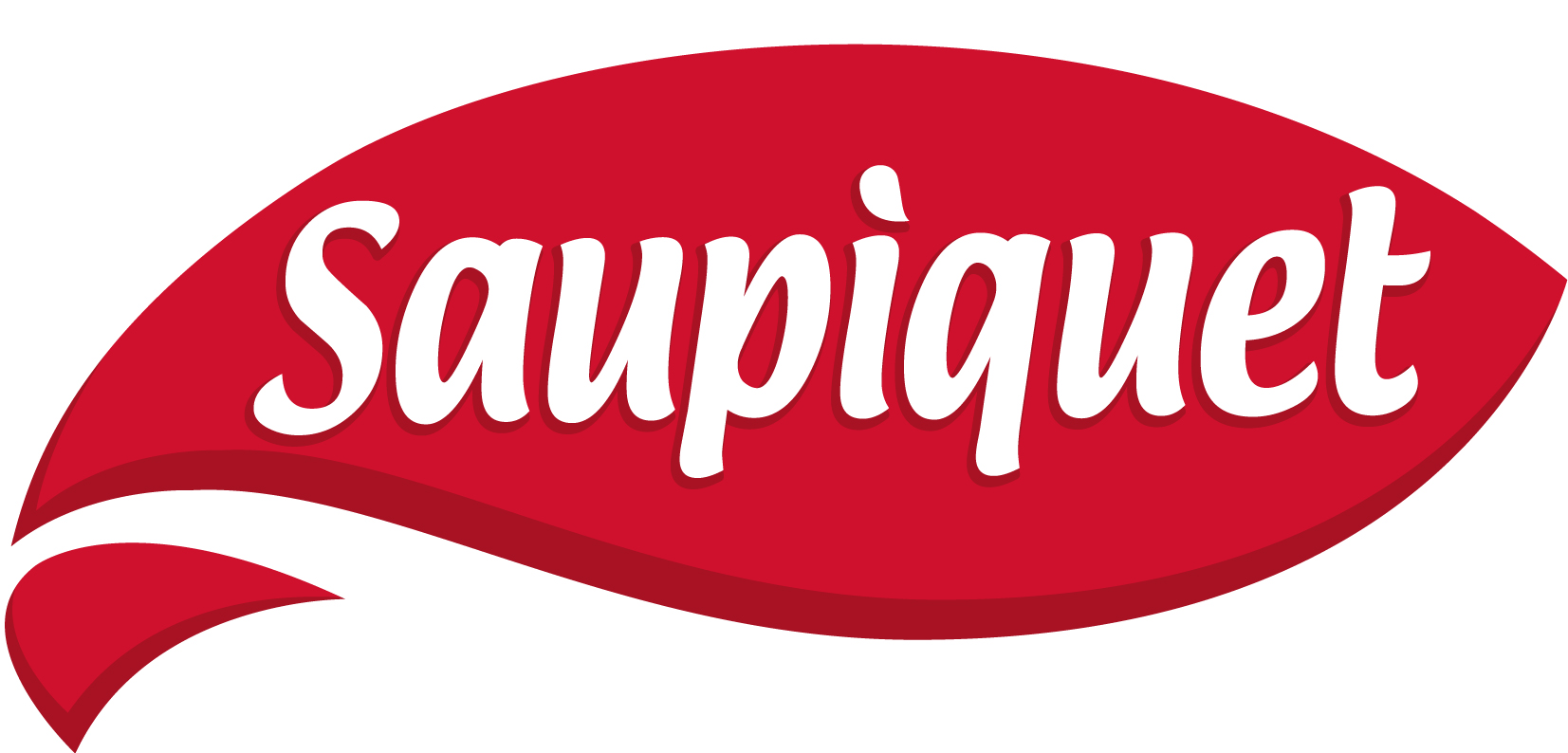
- Company type: Subsidiary
- Industry: Fishing
- Founded: 1891; 134 years ago in Nantes, France
- Founder: Arsène Saupiquet
- Fate: Acquired by Bolton Food
- Headquarters: Courbevoie, France
- Products: Canned fish
- Parent: Bolton Group
- Website: saupiquet.com

Saupiquet is a French company founded in Nantes in 1891 which specializes in fish canning, particularly tuna.

== History ==
In the 1870s, Arsène Saupiquet (born 1849), originally from Jussac, a village in Cantal, moved to Nantes with his family to occupy the position of director of the new factory that the tinsmith Alfred Riom (future mayor of the city) has just created. Saupiquet thus continued his career in the Riom establishments where he began at the age of 10 following the death of his father.

In 1877, Arsène Saupiquet created his own cannery specializing in sardines, then founded in 1891 the eponymous canning company under the “Saupiquet” brand.

In 1900, the company already had nine factories in Brittany and Vendée. From 1955, Saupiquet continued a long series of family associations and took over almost all of the Nantes canneries. It thus absorbs Teyssonneau (Bordeaux), Griffon (Cholet) and Tertrais (Nantes). In 1960, the “Arsène Saupiquet” companies became the “Compagnie Saupiquet”. In 1989, the company sold its vegetable canning business as well as its Cassegrain subsidiary to its competitor Bonduelle, allowing it to refocus on its main activity: canned fish.

After having belonged to Paribas Affairs Industrielles (PAI), Saupiquet was bought at the end of 1999 by the Italian group Bolton Group, known in France by the brands UHU, Carolin and Rogé-Cavaillès. This closed the Saint-Gilles-Croix-de-Vie factory in 2001. In March 2005, the Nantes factory with its 70 employees, as well as the company's head office in the Cité des Ducs, installed since the 1950s on Boulevard Jules-Verne, closed their doors for good. Finally, in 2010, it was the turn of the Saint-Avé factory, in Morbihan, which specializes in the manufacture of tuna-based salad bowls and tuna in sauce.

== Production ==
In France, the company only has one factory, in Quimper (Finistère) in the Moulin Vert district, which processes mackerel or sardine fillets. Between 1987 and 2010, the company went from ten to just one production site.

== Fleet ==
Saupiquet has its own fleet of tuna boats: Via Avenir, Via Euros, Via Harmattan, Via Mistral, Via Zéphyr which fishes in different regions. On October 13, 2009, the two tuna ships Avenir and Mistral were boarded by pirates off the coast of Africa who were repelled by the marine commandos present on board.

== See also ==
- John West Foods
