= Calvo =

Calvo may refer to:

== Places ==
- Luis Calvo, a province of Bolivia
- Porto Calvo, a municipality in Alagoas, Brazil
- Calvo, Cumbria, a hamlet in England, United Kingdom

== Other uses ==
- Calvo (surname)
- Calvo Doctrine, a foreign policy doctrine
- Grupo Calvo, a group of Spanish companies dedicated to fishing, processing, and distribution of canned goods
- California Volcano Observatory (CalVO)
