= John West Foods =

UK-based seafood company

John West Foods Ltd
- Type: Seafoods
- Founded: 1857; 169 years ago, as Pelling Stanley and Company
- Owner: Thai Union Group
- Website: www.john-west.co.uk

John West Foods is a United Kingdom-based seafood marketing company established in 1857, and currently owned by Thai Union Group of Thailand. The company produces canned salmon and tuna, as well as mackerel, sardine, herring, brisling, anchovies and shellfish.

== History ==
The original company was founded by T. L. Pelling and C. H. Stanley, who created Pelling Stanley and Company in 1857 In Liverpool. The company soon specialized in importing canned food, which at the time was a novel product. By 1879, they were importing canned salmon from the John West company in Oregon, US. Pelling Stanley purchased the rights to use the John West name in 1888. The first shipments of John West Salmon appeared in 1892.

By 1924, the three companies, operating separately, were all associated with Unilever:

- Angus Watson and Co.
- R B Green and Co.
- Pelling Stanley and Company

By 1964, Unilever had merged the three into one company, John West Foods. Branches were expanded to Australia and Africa in 1974.

In 1997, Heinz acquired the brand and the majority of the John West Food company operations, excluding those in Australia, New Zealand and South Africa which continued to be part of Unilever. In June 2003, Simplot Australia bought the John West canned fish business in Australia from Unilever Australasia. In March 2006, Heinz sold its European Seafoods business to French-based MW Brands, itself owned by Lehman Brothers banking group, for EUR 425 million.

In 2010, Thailand-based seafood processing company Thai Union Group bought MWBrands, becoming the world's largest canned-tuna producer.

== Sustainability issues ==
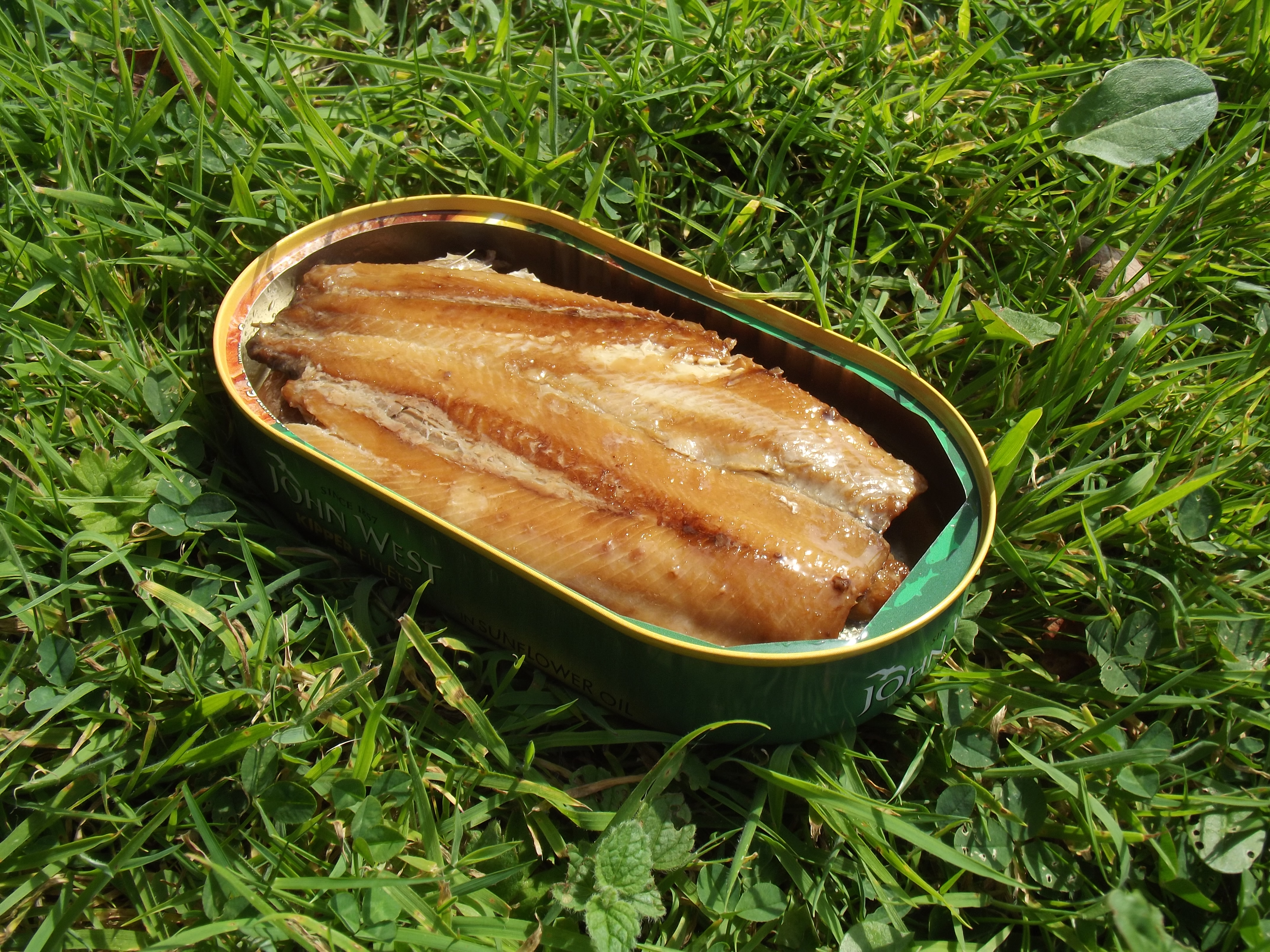
John West canned fish

John West states that their salmon, mackerel and sardine products are certified to the Marine Stewardship Council's (MSC) standard for a well-managed and sustainable fishery, and that every can in these ranges carries the Marine Stewardship Council logo.

John West also states that they do not sell endangered or critically endangered species from the International Union Conservation of Nature Red List, have never sold blue fin tuna, which is the subject of numerous campaigns from Non-Governmental Organizations due to its endangered status from overfishing, that all seafood products are caught in accordance with the United Nations Convention on the Law of the Sea (UNCLOS), and are not bought from IUU (Illegal, Unreported, Unregulated) vessels, neither does it buy any fish that has been transshipped at sea, caught by long-line fishing or drift nets, caught by boats from any flag state which is not a member of the relevant Regional Fisheries Management Organisation (RFMO), caught by fishing vessels which do not ban shark finning, or caught by vessels which do not have a European Union sanitary agreement.

However several of these claims have been disputed by other bodies.

In August 2008, John West was assessed by conservation group Greenpeace as selling the least sustainable tinned tuna in the UK in its Tuna League. It was also criticised for indiscriminate use of destructive fishing methods leading to the decimation of turtle and shark populations, and Greenpeace noted that John West failed to show sufficient care in selecting healthier fish stocks.

In 2011, the company committed to source all of its tuna through a combination of pole and line and purse seine FAD-free (fish aggregation devices) sustainable catch methods by the end of 2016. The first step towards this was the launch of pole and line tuna in September 2011.

By 2016 the company had reneged on this promise, with just 2% of its fish caught using pole-and-line. The estimated 98% of John West's tuna caught using methods harmful to the environment or to other species such as dolphins, lead the company to last place again in Greenpeace's 2015 tuna sustainability ranking. John West stated that "Quite simply, there is no longer enough pole and line tuna available to meet global demand ... we have found it extremely difficult to increase the proportion of John West pole and line tuna that we can provide". In a rebuttal, Greenpeace pointed out that it was the lack of investment from large fleet-owners and processors like John West that result in this situation, and that John West had felt it achievable in 2011.

=== Traceability ===
John West is the only UK and Ireland canned seafood manufacturer to wholly own a fleet of vessels which ensures it has visibility of its entire fishing supply chain. In October 2011, following the above controversies, the company advertised that its supply chain would be made fully transparent for its consumers by allowing "100% tracing" by the public of each can of fish to the original boat and location of catch, using a 'Can Tracker' on the company's website. The application enabled John West consumers to track the exact source of the fish in their can including the ocean and even the boat that made the catch.

However, in October 2015, John West was accused by conservation group Greenpeace of not standing by their word, and of having made a "deeply misleading" and "plainly false" promise to this effect. Greenpeace asked for volunteers to check the traceability codes on John West cans. It was found that although the website showed tuna only being caught in the Seychelles, Ghana and Portugal, in fact a large number of cans were sourced from canneries owned by John West's parent company Thai Union in the Samut Sakhon region of Thailand. This was not disclosed on the website, and tracing was not provided for such cans; the area's fishing industry is also notorious for human rights abuse and forced and bonded labour on fishing ships, and for the use of indiscriminate and harmful fishing methods.

John West described the omission as "simply a website limitation". The controversy became widely reported in the news, leading to John West changing its website to state that customers wishing to trace a can from Thailand should email the company instead, for further details.

== Bear fight commercial ==
In November 2000, John West released a television advertisement depicting a bear fighting a fisherman for a fresh salmon. The video was viewed over 300 million times on YouTube. It was filmed on Invercauld Estate, near Balmoral, on the River Dee in the Scottish Highlands. The video campaign won multiple advertising industry awards.

== See also ==
- Saupiquet, French canned fish company
