= UHU =

German glue product

UHU GmbH
- UHU Logo

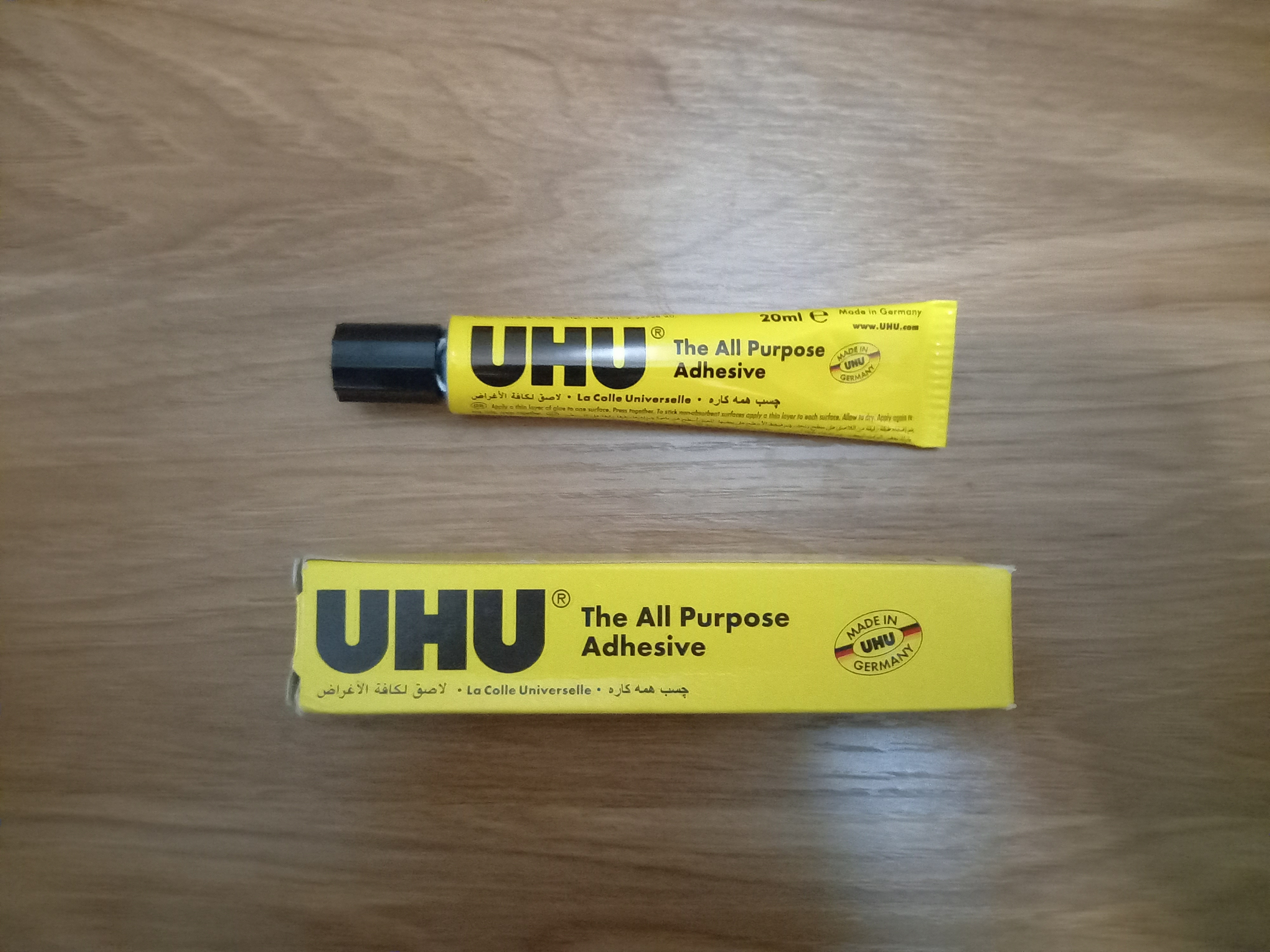
- UHU glue and the box
- Formerly: Fischer's company
- Type: GmbH
- Industry: Materials
- Founded: 1884; 142 years ago in Germany
- Founder: August Fischer
- Headquarters: Germany
- Area served: Worldwide
- Products: Adhesives
- Revenue: €115.76 million (2020)
- Number of employees: 450 (2021)
- Parent: Bolton Group
- Website: www.uhu.com/en

UHU GmbH & Co. KG is a German manufacturer of adhesive products, based in Bühl, Germany. Its company slogan is "glues anything, anytime.". The company logo is yellow with black lettering and in many markets it includes the German phrase: "Der Alleskleber" (the "everything-glue").

The products are now sold in over 125 countries around the world.

== History ==
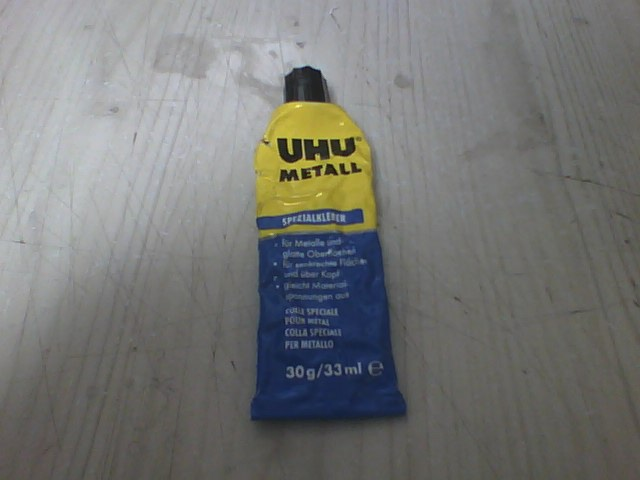
UHU Adhesive

In 1905, August Fischer, a dispensing chemist, purchased a small chemical plant aiming to manufacture inks, rubber stamp pads, paints and adhesives. In 1932, Fischer developed a clear synthetic resin adhesive which displayed the ability to affix almost any material. Following the custom of the time to name products in the writing goods sector after birds, Fischer named the glue UHU (pronounced in German as [ˈuːhu], with /ˈjuːhuː/ in being common in many English-speaking countries) after Uhu, the onomatopoeic German name for the eagle-owl, a bird which at the time could still be found in the Black Forest. There is an account of glue being used by British prisoners of war in Germany during WW2, and this is referred to by them as 'Uhu'. Another version of the origin of the company's name is that it supplied the glue in kits for a model airplane named "UHU" (Owl). This model design was built by German youngsters for an annual contest named "Der Kleine Uhu" (the small owl) that began around 1950. The contest was very popular, and the glue became a popular item with German hobbyists, so the name stuck.

In 1971, Fischer's company, renamed UHU after its leading product, was taken over by the Beecham Group of England (which subsequently became a part of GlaxoSmithKline), but regained independence for a few years after a management buyout in 1989. In 1994, UHU became a totally owned subsidiary of the Bolton Group, an Italian manufacturer of branded consumer goods.

== Operations and products ==
Production activities are mainly concentrated in Europe, while product distribution takes place in 125 countries. UHU products are intended for domestic, professional, educational and hobby use. The company markets adhesives and glues formulated for different materials, including paper, wood, plastic and metal. Since 2016, it has introduced a line of glues made from plant-based materials, with reduced plastic and free of solvents.

== Guinness World Records ==
The company has achieved one world record in Germany, in October 2007. A Ford pickup truck weighing about four tonnes was suspended from a crane with the help of UHU glue. Two steel parts 7 centimetres (2.8 in) in diameter were glued together with an UHU derivative and were used to connect car and crane hook.

This record was subsequently beaten in March 2009 by the German firm Henkel, who lifted a similar Ford truck, this time with a Smart microcar in the back, giving a total weight of 5.02 tonnes.
