= International Seafood Sustainability Foundation =

Organization

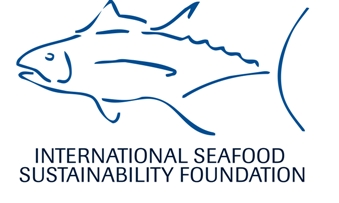
- Headquarters: Pittsburgh, PA
- Members: Current participating companies, including founding companies, are listed on the ISSF website:
- President: Susan Jackson
- Website: www.iss-foundation.org

International Seafood Sustainability Foundation (ISSF) was formed in 2009 as a global, non-profit partnership among the tuna industry, scientists and World Wide Fund for Nature. The multistakeholder group states its mission is "to undertake science-based initiatives for the long-term conservation and sustainable use of tuna stocks, reducing bycatch and promoting ecosystem health". Regional Fisheries Management Organizations (RFMOs) are primarily responsible for managing the world's tuna stocks—skipjack, yellowfin and albacore tuna, the species most commonly processed for canned and shelf-stable tuna products, but their parliamentary procedures too often allow the short-term economic and political interests of nations to prevent sustainable measures from being adopted. ISSF works to ensure that effective international management practices are in place to maintain the health of all the tuna stocks.

While ISSF is not generally involved in the bluefin segment of the industry, which primarily supplies the sashimi market, the board has enacted a statement of concern urging the adoption of policies supporting proper management of bluefin in the Atlantic – one of the most threatened of all tuna stocks, and they now include bluefin populations in their Status of the Stocks Reports.

== Purpose ==
The ISSF provides regional fisheries management organizations with scientific recommendations to help promote tuna fishing practices that keep oceans (and tuna stocks such as skipjack tuna, albacore tuna, and yellowfin tuna) productive and healthy. In addition the ISSF helps nations combat and monitor illegal and unregulated fishing, a global problem that can damage marine ecosystems and endanger future fish stocks.

== Conservation measures ==
ISSF adopted conservation measures under its principle of governance:

Work with RFMOs to achieve their objectives of conservation of tuna stocks and their ecosystems;
Employ sound science for maximum sustainable yields of targeted tuna stocks;
Strive to eliminate illegal, unregulated, and unreported tuna catching;
Provide for the health and care of the marine ecosystem;
Facilitate use of the precautionary approach;
Minimize by-catch, discards, and abandoned gear;
Collect and exchange data to promote better scientific understanding of tuna stocks;
Support certification programs that meet the 2005 eco-labeling guidelines of the United Nations Food and Agriculture Organization.

== Participants ==
The founders of ISSF are Bolton Alimentari; Bumble Bee Foods, LLC / Clover Leaf Seafoods; MW Brands; Princes Ltd.; Sea Value Co., Ltd.; StarKist Co.; Thai Union Manufacturing Co. Ltd / Chicken of the Sea Intl.; TriMarine International; and WWF, the world's leading conservation organization.

In 2010, Negocios Industriales Real NIRSA S.A., FRINSA, Conservas Garavilla, S.A. and Jealsa Rianxeira S. A. joined the ISSF founders as Participating Companies. In 2011, Chotiwat Manufacturing Co., Ltd, Salica Industria Alimentaria, S.A., R.S. Cannery Co., Ltd, South Seas Tuna Corp, Sealord, Pataya Foods and Asian Alliance joined ISSF. 2012 brought Thai canner, MMP International, and Korean processor Dongwon F&B to ISSF.

=== Major retailer participation ===
Processors, traders and importers that participate in ISSF are members of the International Seafood Sustainability Association (ISSA). Membership in ISSA is voluntary and is contingent upon compliance with ISSF conservation measures and standards of practice.

In 2010, major retailers began unveiling sustainability policies that support the work of the ISSF, including Walmart and Loblaw.

== Practices ==
=== The Status of the World Fisheries for Tuna ===
The Foundation publishes a yearly report called The Status of the World Fisheries for Tuna, which compiles the most recent science to determine the health of the 19 tuna stocks which support commercial fishing. The most recently updated version of the assessment was released in December 2012.

In 2010, ISSF released its Strategic Plan with three distinct lines of approach for conservation and sustainability of tuna stocks – applied science, advocacy and direct market action. These approaches are applied to six areas of focused effort – managing fishing capacity, mitigating bycatch, eradicating illegal, unreported and unregulated (IUU) fishing, expanding data support, advancing industry performance through monitoring, control and surveillance (MCS) and improving overall tuna stock health.

=== ProActive Vessel Register ===
ISSF's ProActive Vessel Register (PVR) was created in late 2012 and designed to provide third-party validated information on the positive steps fishing vessels take to improve responsible fishing practices. The PVR identifies which of more than 25 ISSF Commitments each vessel has adopted, including implementing strategies to increase supply chain transparency, providing complete catch data to management bodies and continuing education in best practices that reduce fishing's impact on the greater marine environment.

=== Bigeye tuna recovery efforts ===
Prior to the annual meeting of the International Commission for the Conservation of Atlantic Tunas (IATTC) in November 2010, the ISSF urged decision-makers to focus on bigeye tuna stocks rather than increasing the focus on bluefin tuna, another Atlantic species in decline. According to ICCAT's Standing Committee on Research and Statistics (SCRS), bigeye tuna is on its way to recovering from an overfished state, but an increase in catches from the current level could reverse the trend.

The current conservation recommendation has the total allowable catch for Atlantic bigeye at 85,000 metric tons. In 2009, the catch was slightly higher than that, and, with a recent increase in the number of vessels operating in the Atlantic, future catches could continue to exceed the scientific advice.

=== Bycatch mitigation project ===
Since 2011, ISSF has been sponsoring a series of cruises in which scientific researchers work with fishers on actual fishing excursions to find methods to mitigate bycatch and better understand how fish behave around FADs. These globally coordinated cruises have been in the Indian and Pacific Oceans and have lasted anywhere from 11 days to two and a half months. The purpose of these cruises is to gain scientific inputs to initiate improvements within the tuna purse seine fishery to reduce the environmental impact of fishing for tuna with FADs. Each cruise accomplished a series of tasks to test improved gear designs and study the behavior of tuna and non-targeted species gathering at FADs. Researchers of shark bycatch and behavior have also a primary subject of research during these cruises.

In 2011 researchers lead cruises in the Eastern Pacific Ocean testing natural behavior of tuna and non-target species, conducted experiments to attract sharks away from FADs, testing alternative FAD designs and shark release best practices.

In 2012 the ISSF lead research cruises in the West Indian Ocean and the Western and Central Pacific Ocean expanding on the work that was done at-sea in 2011.

=== Skipper workshops ===
ISSF Bycatch Project cruises paved the way for ISSF-lead workshops held in fishing ports in the Americas, Africa, Europe and the Pacific Islands region. The workshops are modeled after a program that was designed and put into practice by the Inter-American Tropical Tuna Commission (IATTC) in the eastern Pacific Ocean. As best practices are learned either through the Bycatch Project or elsewhere, some of the leading scientists and fishing experts in the world act as teachers to both fishers and policymakers in tuna fishing regions around the world.

=== Make the Commitment project ===
In July 2011, the ISSF launched the Make the Commitment project, the next phase of its strategic effort to transform tuna fisheries. The global improvement plan addresses the sustainability of the three most common methods of tuna fishing: purse seine, longline, and pole and line.

"Advocacy alone is insufficient, research alone is insufficient and it is not enough to simply educate...In order to improve the sustainability of tuna stocks, there must be a combination of these efforts working in tandem, with the same goal." -Susan Jackson, President of ISSF

The Make the Commitment project, which is a Global Improvement Plan for Better Practices in Tuna Fisheries, is available online, and recognizes that rather than abandoning fisheries with flaws, stakeholders should work to facilitate advancements. ISSF is calling on fishers, processors, governments and conservationists to put their strengths to work for the most commonly fished tuna species – skipjack, yellowfin, bigeye, and albacore.

Commitments currently in effect:
• ISSF participating companies are to refrain from transactions in tuna caught by vessels on the IUU list of any tRFMO;
• Vessels will provide data to tRFMO scientific bodies to support the execution of their responsibility for tuna conservation and management;
• tuna products must comply with ISSF resolution 09–01, "IUU Fishing", and upon discovery of a violation, a participating company will withdraw product from the market place;
• credibly trace tuna products from capture to plate, including name/flag of catcher and transshipping vessels, fish species, ocean of capture, corresponding tuna RFMO area, fishing trip dates, fishing gear employed, date the company took ownership of the fish and each species by weight;
• refrain from transactions in tuna caught by large-scale pelagic driftnets and
• establish and publish company policy prohibiting shark-finning.

=== Fishing capacity reduction ===
The ISSF Board adopted a conservation measure to limit the growth in fishing capacity of the global large-scale tropical tuna purse seine fleet. The resolution calls on processors, traders, importers and others to refrain from transactions in skipjack, bigeye and yellowfin tuna caught by large-scale purse seine vessels that did not exist before January 2013, unless new vessels replace existing capacity.

=== Marine Protected Areas ===
ISSF commissioned a study to determine if Marine Protected Areas (MPAs) can be put to work for the conservation of tuna stocks and found that area closure could be an effective tool but more research is needed. To further explore the issue, ISSF held a workshop with more than 30 conservation and science experts to consider if MPAs can be effectively used, and how they can be implemented.

=== 100% purse seine observer coverage ===
The ISSF Board adopted a conservation measure calling on processors, traders and importers to refrain from transactions with purse seine vessels that do not have an onboard observer as of January 2013. ISSF is also developing a training program to ensure that observer coverage, and subsequent data collection, is effective.

ISSF also conducts "real world" testing of video electronic monitoring systems designed for instances where onboard human observation is not practical or as a support to live observation.

=== FAD management ===
Data on fish aggregating devices, known as FADs, is currently sparse in many ocean regions. ISSF has developed an electronic FAD logbook for vessels to record usage data and electronically report that information directly to RFMO scientific bodies. The ISSF Board has called for industry participants to support only those vessels that report their FAD usage via logbooks after January 2013. This data is a necessary component of the meaningful implementation of FAD management by RFMOs, which ISSF also supports.
