= Grupo Calvo =

Spanish canned goods company

Luis Calvo Sanz, S.A.
- Type: Sociedad Anónima
- Industry: Canned goods
- Founded: Carballo, Galicia, Spain (1940)
- Founder: Luis Calvo Sanz
- Headquarters: Carballo, Spain
- Area served: Nationwide
- Key people: José Luis Calvo Pumpido (President); Manuel Calvo García-Benavides (Managing Director)
- Revenue: €426.72 million (2009)
- Net income: ▲€15.7 million (2009)
- Number of employees: 5,200
- Divisions: Calvo Conservas; Calvo Envases
- Subsidiaries: Calvo, Razo, Nostromo, Gomes da Costa, San Marco
- Website: www.calvo.es

The Calvo Group is a backward vertically integrated group of companies dedicated to fishing, processing and distribution of canned goods. The group is centred on Luis Calvo Sanz, S.A., a company established in 1940 in Carballo.

Grupo Calvo operated in the town of Guanta, Venezuela under the name "Atuneras del Oriente" (ATORSA) and, later, as Industrias Calvo Conservas de Venezuela S.A. Between 1991 and 2001, they had to temporarily close due to lack of tuna. A few years after its reopening, in 2004 it had labor conflicts with part of the workforce, as it wanted to substantially reduce it. That same year, it suffered an armed attack that ended up setting fire to the Venezuelan facilities, causing considerable material damage.

In 2003, Calvo opened a facility in El Salvador, specifically, in Puerto La Unión. In 2006, Calvo expanded its canned fish facility in Gomes da Costa, Brazil. In November 2008, Calvo closed its cannery in Laayoune, Western Sahara. In 2008, Calvo had a net profit of two million euros. Since 2017, the power of the company is 77.8% in the hands of the Calvo family and 22.2% in the hands of the Italian giant Bolton Group, who paid a total of 70 million to take over the shares they previously had. In 2017, and for the first time, it began to distribute its products under the white label of the Día supermarket chain.
