= House of Falkenstein =

German noble family

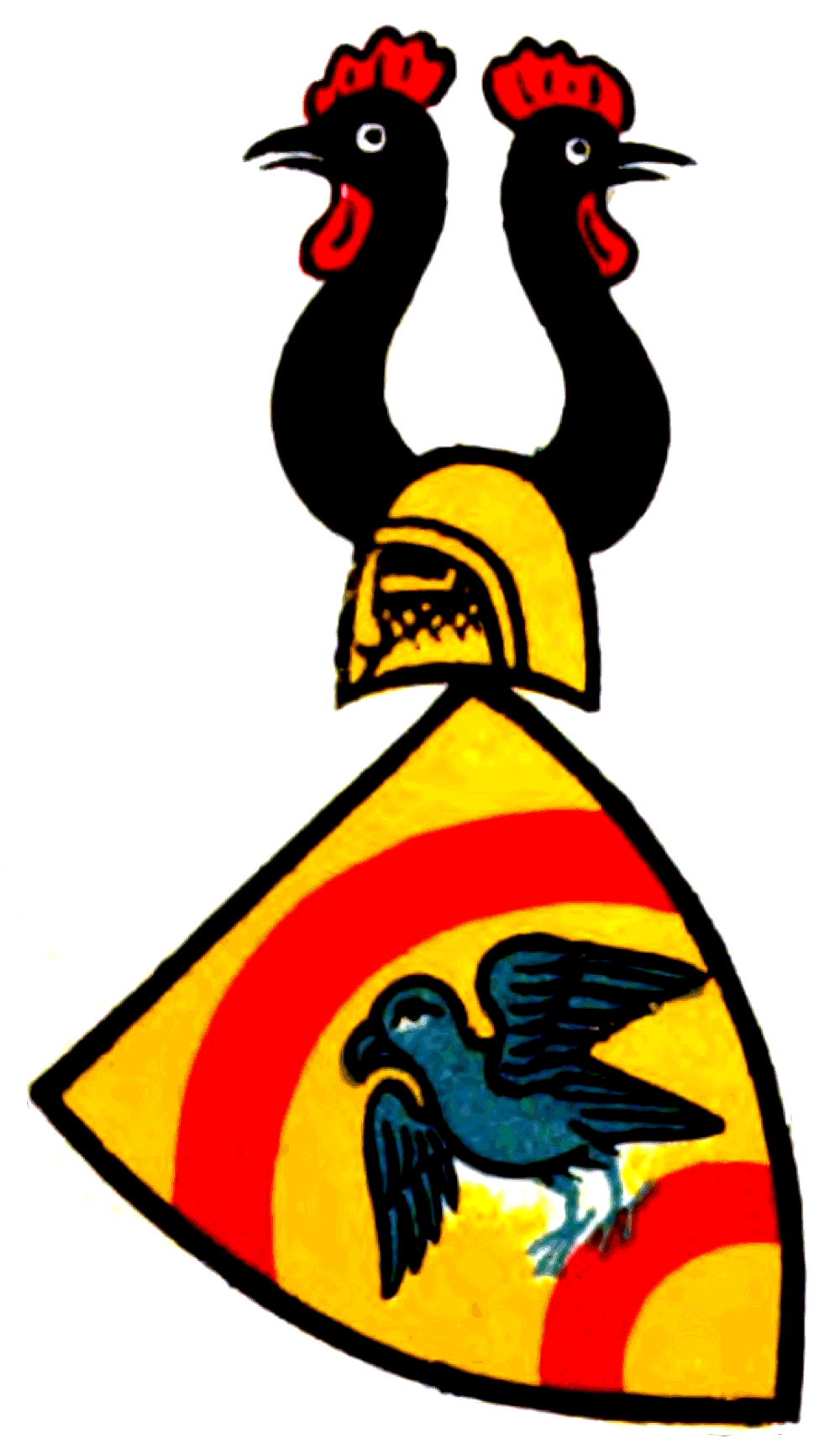
Coat of arms of the lords of Falkenstein in the Zurich Armorial

The Lords of Falkenstein in the Höllental (German: Herren von Falkenstein im Höllental) already so-called in von Knobloch's Upper Baden Family Book (Oberbadischem Geschlechterbuch) of 1898 to 1919, had its main family seat at Falkenstein Castle on a steep hill spur where the narrow Höllental valley opened up into the broad Dreisam valley. The name Falkenstein was borne by many noble families; Kindler of Knobloch counted six in the Upper Baden region alone: "im Höllenthale", "auf dem Schwarzwalde", "zu Rimsingen", "am Bodensee", "im Buchsgau", "im Wasgau".

== History ==
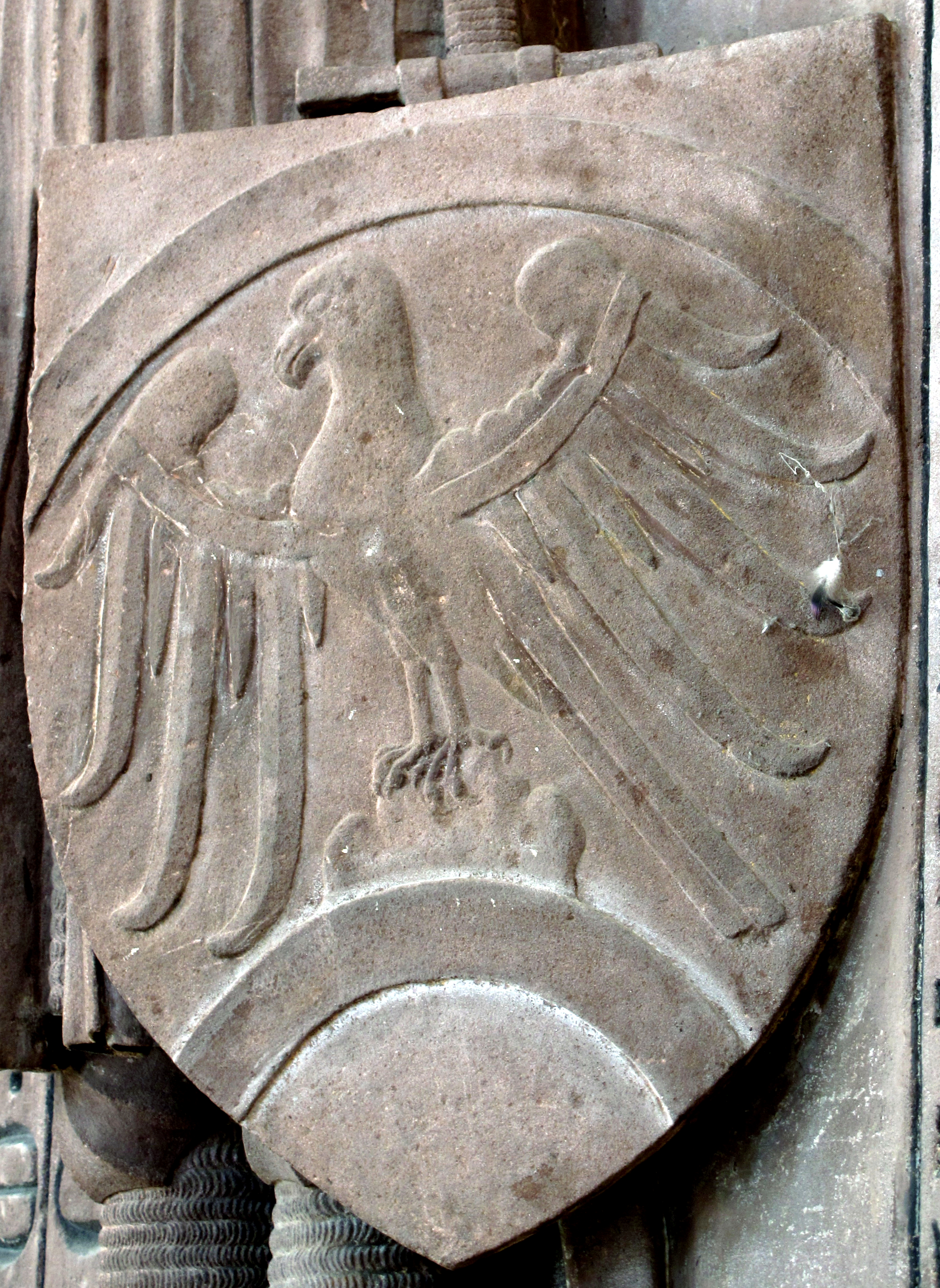
Coat of arms on the gravestone of Kuno of Falkenstein in St. Gallus (Kirchzarten)

The Falkensteins, named after their castle above the Höllental, were closely related to, and probably descended from, the lords of Weiler, who had their centre of gravity in a predecessor building of today's Schloss Weiler in Stegen at the mouth of the Witten and Eschbach valleys in the Dreisam Valley. If one looks at the undated notes in the Rotulus Sanpetrinus, an index of goods belonging to the Abbey of St. Peter in the Black Forest, then a Reynard of Weiler was the first to name himself von Falkenstein after his new castle, Burg Reinhard, in 1152. Like the lords of Weiler, the Falkensteins were ministeriales of the dukes of Zähringen. The Reynard mentioned is accordingly called de domo ducis, "of the duke's retinue." The lords of Weiler had already advised the Zähringens on the choice of place for their family monastery of St. Peter in the Black Forest in 1093. They and the Falkensteins supported the Zähringens against the counts of Haigerloch, whose possessions included Wiesneck Castle and the vogtei east of Stegen enfeoffed by St. Märgen's Abbey founded before 1121.

"We can guess that the Zähringens, in opening up the Black Forest, gave the Falkensteins the task of clearing the area around the Zartenbach stream (today the Rotbach, Höllenbach). In 1148, they reached the "untere Steige" ("Lower Reaches"), the valley near Höllsteig, and erected the Oswald Chapel there." At its peak, the Falkenstein area, excluding from scattered estates, encompassed the Dreisam Valley from the mouth of the Krummbach upwards and the catchment of the Rotbach to Lake Titisee, from there northwards as far as Thurner and southwards to the Feldberg, including the village of Zastler. In addition to the Falkenstein Castle, they had another more recent fortification, the remains of which were called "the ruins of Bubenstein", a castle called New Falkenstein (Neufalkenstein) west of Kirchzarten and the Dinghof farm at Kirchzarten, where they acted as advocates and vassal lords of the Abbey of St. Gallen. Apart from the aforementioned Reynard the following members of the family were important:

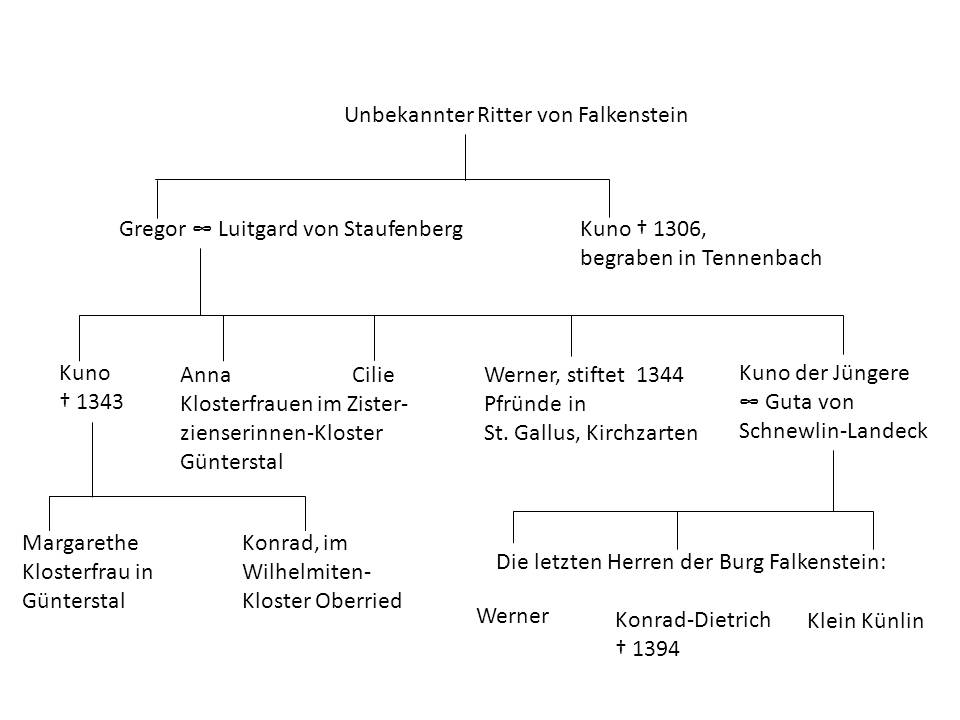
Extract of the family tree of the lords of Falkenstein in Höllental.

- James of Falkenstein (died 1298), to whom the commandry of the Knights Hospitaller in Freiburg im Breisgau confirmed the advocacy and fief, when they sold the patronage of the Kirchzarten parish church of St. Gallus in 1297 to the Abbey of St. Gallen. After his death, the fief when to the related line of Gregory of Falkenstein.
- Gregory of Falkenstein (died 1331) married Liutgart of Stauffenberg. In 1287, the oldest parchment codex of the Schwabenspiegel was written for him. He sponsored an annual requiem for his brother, Kuno, who died in 1306 and is buried in Tennenbach Abbey
- Kuno of Falkenstein (died 1343), the son of Gregory, bought his father's fief in 1320, namely the high jurisdiction over Kirchzarten together with its estates, hunting rights and serfs "with all the possession that we have had so far". Kuno was laid to rest in the parish church of St. Gallus, where his gravestone has survived. According to tradition he was made a crusader knight. "To the researcher he is well known from various documents as "Lord over Kirchzarten", and his nearest family members often have close ties with our village. But every child knows Sir (Ritter) Kuno of Falkenstein, because a glorifying legend has grown up around him." One son was prior in the Williamite abbey at Oberried, one daughter entered the Cistercian nunnery at Günterstal.
- John (Hans) of Falkenstein purchased the lower part of the Bruderhalde (in the Bärental valley) c. 1350 from John (Hans) of Hohenfürst (Hochfirst).
- Kuno the Younger, the youngest brother of the aforegoing, had a second marriage to a Schnewlin of Landeck, whose family later inherited the Falkenstein estate.
- Werner, Conrad-Dietrich and Little Künlin, three sons from this marriage, were accused of highway robbery in 1390 at the manorial court of Rottweil. Their castle was destroyed in 1389. Whether they were really guilty of being robber barons is not clear. It was the time of the leagues of towns, who engaged in fierce feuds against the princes. In any case, the Freiburgers reported:

to our good and healthy friends, the masters, the sheriffs and councillors who are named below, Strasbourg, Basle, Colmar, Sletzat, Rinfelden, Baden, Waldshut and Bruges, ... as you know about the war, which the lords and the towns of the Federation have waged against one another, you know too that Werner of Falkenstein, son of Lord Kuno of Falkenstein, once a knight, himself took up arms in this same war against the towns on behalf of the noble lords on account of Lord Wirtenberg, whose vassal he was, as he said. For this reason, this same Werner occupied Falkenstein Castle, in which he had a small stake, so that no-one might walk by on the road or through the valley without him or his retinue knowing who it was; and if he understood that he belonged to the towns of the Federation, he robbed him as is commonplace in all wars... and we advanced on the same Saint Nicholas' Eve to this castle, and captured it the same day with the help of Almighty God and burned, devastated and punished it in such measure that on Saint Nicholas' Day we dared lavishly praise God and bless all pious people who walk this road trustingly.

Conrad-Dietrich and Little Künlin were imprisoned, but were released in 1390 on swearing an Urfehdeschwur, an oath never to participate in a feud again. All three Falkensteins survived the feud without suffering permanent loss.

Werner, Conrad-Dietrich and Little Künlin were the last lords of the castle. It remained in ruins. The Falkenstein estates gradually transferred to others, especially urban patricians such as the Schnewlins of Landeck. The Falkensteins continued to live in other houses in Freiburg, however, and often held leading positions there. "In such a way, in more recent centuries they were making decisions about Kirchzarten valley and its farmers which their knightly ancestors had ruled for the castles there and which had now come under the jurisdiction and administration (Talvogtei) of the town."

== Coat of arms ==
Or, two bars gules wavy, with an eagle rising, wings displayed, azure.

== Literature ==
- Günther Haselier (ed.): Kirchzarten. Geographie – Geschichte – Gegenwart. Selbstverlag der Gemeinde Kirchzarten, 1966.
- Julius Kindler von Knobloch: Oberbadisches Geschlechterbuch. 3 volumes. Carl Winter's Universitätsbuchhandlung, Heidelberg 1898–1919. Vol. 1, pp. 323–328. (digitalised publication)
- Bernhard Mangei: Herrschaftsbildung von Königtum, Kirche und Adel zwischen Oberrhein und Schwarzwald. Dissertation, Freiburg, 2003. (Full text)
