= Wiesneck Castle =

- Burg Wiesneck
- Buchenbach-Wiesneck
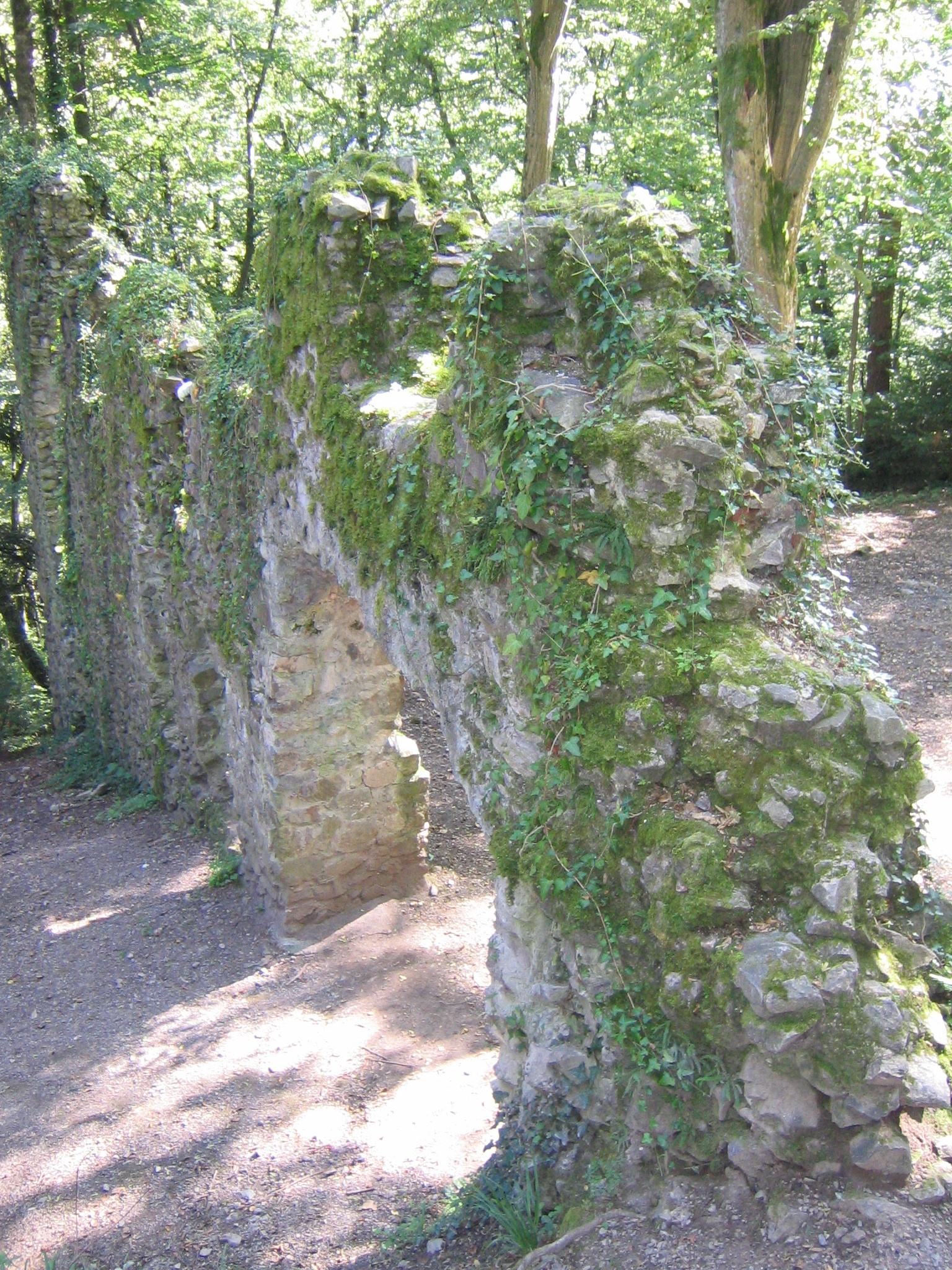
- The ruins of Wiesneck

Site information
- Type: Village site
- Code: DE-BW
- Condition: ruin

Location
- Location within Baden-Württemberg Location within Germany
- Coordinates: 47°58′0.01″N 7°59′58.79″E
- Height: 537 m above sea level (NN)

Site history
- Built: 1079

Garrison information
- Occupants: counts

Wiesneck Castle (German: Burg Wiesneck) is a ruined castle in the village of Wiesneck in the municipality of Buchenbach in the Southern Black Forest in the county of Breisgau-Hochschwarzwald in the southwest German state of Baden-Württemberg.

== Location ==
The ruins lie in the Zarten Basin at the entrance to the Höllental valley, the Wagensteig valley and the Unteribental valley. The castle occupied a strategic site and guarded the road through the valley of the Wagensteigbach up to Thurner.

The village of Wiesneck grew up around the castle early. The village was incorporated into the municipality of Buchenbach in 1837.

== History ==
The castle was first mentioned in 1079 and was in the possession of the counts of Haigerloch. In 1096, someone was named after the castle for the first time when Count Adalberg of Haigerloch called himself von Haigerloch-Wiesneck. The castle was built on the edge of the territory of the ruling Zähringen family, so the lords of the castle established themselves immediately next to their rivals.

In 1118, Bruno of Haigerloch-Wiesneck founded St. Märgen's Abbey. Around 1121, the castle was first destroyed, by Zähringens, but was soon rebuilt by them. The family of the Counts of Haigerloch-Wiesneck died out in 1170, whereupon castle and estate went to the counts of Hohenberg. They sold it in 1293.

During the Peasants' War, the castle was overrun by a Haufen of rebellious peasants under Hans von Bulgenbach and destroyed, but partially rebuilt soon afterwards.

In 1577, it went to the Freiherren of Sickingen-Hoheburg. During the Thirty Years' War, the castle was destroyed in 1646 by the French invaders. Thereafter, the castle was used as a quarry for the surrounding area.

== Site ==
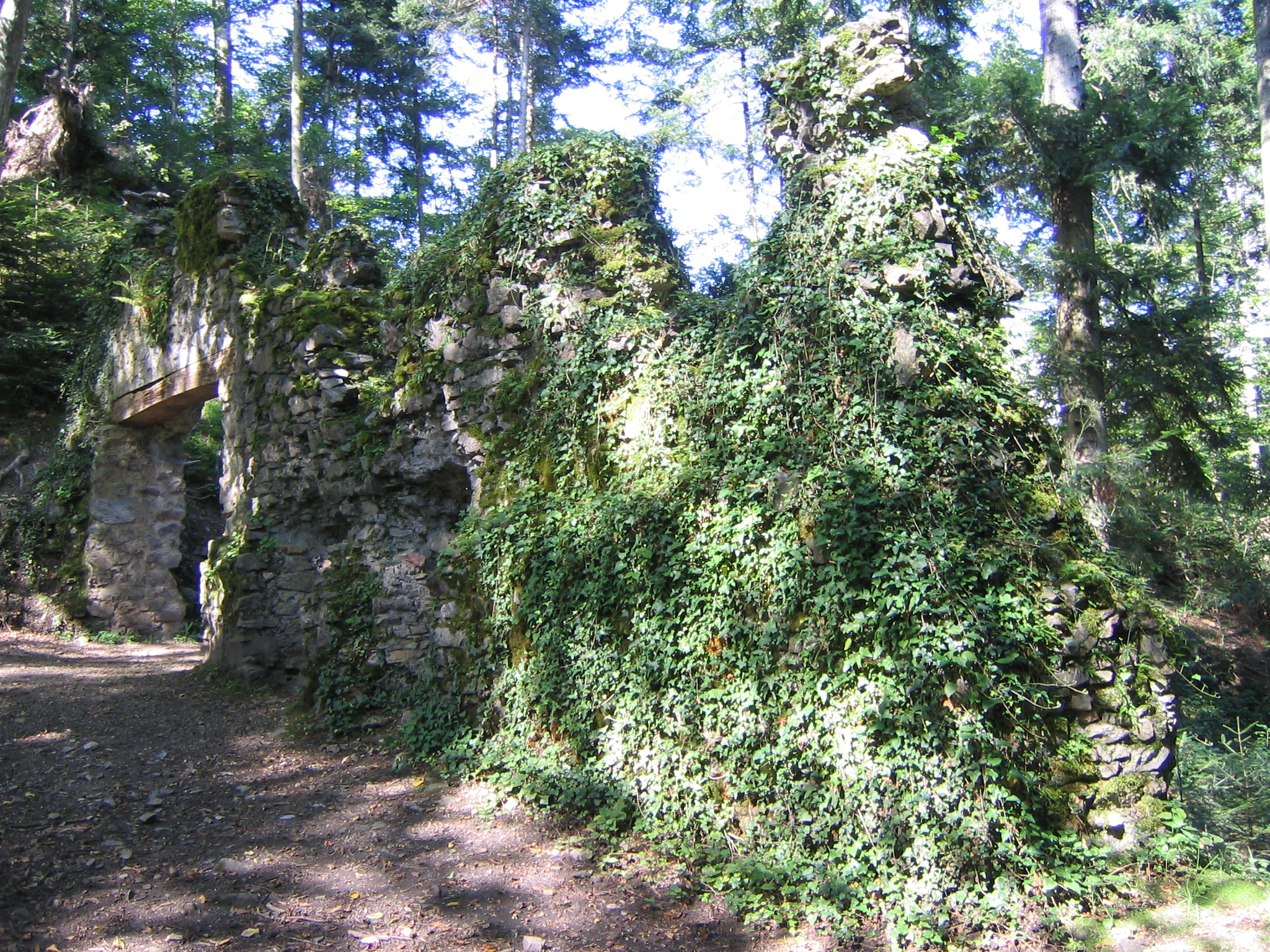
Vegetation growing on the ruins of Wiesneck

Of the old castle, only the entrance area and a few wall-remains survive. Nevertheless, the outer ward, inner ward and palas can still be clearly made out from the remains that prove it was one of the larger castles in the region at the time.

== Literature ==
- Alfond Zettler, Thomas Zotz: Die Burgen im mittelalterlichen Breisgau, 1. Nördlicher Teil, Halbband A-K. Jan Thorbecke Verlag, Ostfildern, 2003, ISBN 3-7995-7364-X, pp. 66–71.
