= Bubenstein Castle =

Bubenstein Castle / New Falkenstein Castle
- Ruine Bubenstein, Neu-Falkenstein
- Buchenbach
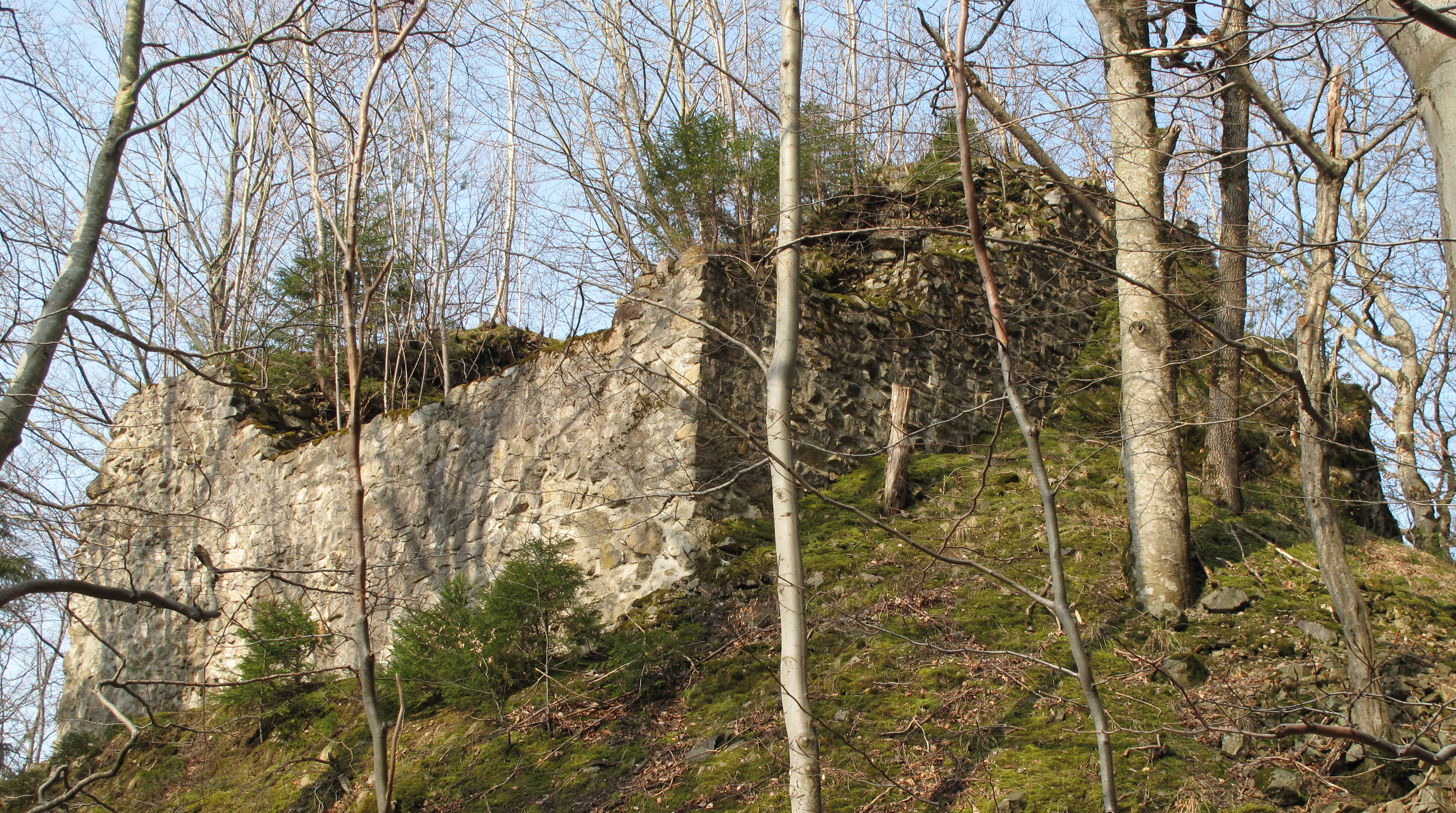
- The remaining stump of the old tower castle

Site information
- Type: hill castle, spur castle
- Code: DE-BW
- Condition: neck ditch, wall remains

Location
- Location within Germany
- Coordinates: 47°56′37″N 8°00′41″E
- Height: 560 m above sea level (NN)

Site history
- Built: 1200 to 1300
- Materials: rubble stone walls

Garrison information
- Occupants: nobility

Bubenstein Castle (German: Ruine Bubenstein), also called New Falkenstein Castle (Neu-Falkenstein), is a ruined spur castle at 560 m above sea level (NN) on a rock spur on the northern side of the Höllental valley, about 500 metres west of Old Falkenstein Castle above the village of Falkensteig in the municipality of Buchenbach in the county of Breisgau-Hochschwarzwald in the southwest German state of Baden-Württemberg.

== History ==
The castle was built by Walter of Falkenstein in the 13th century and in 1266 its residents were recorded as the lords of Falkenstein. In 1328 the lords of Staufen were named as its occupants. In the 19th century, part of the castle rock was blown up for the railway line and in 1960 the castle was dismantled due to its poor state of repair.

== Description ==
The bergfried of the castle measured 10 by 10 metres, and the neck ditch was 5 metres deep and 8 metres wide. Of the old castle only wall remains and the neck ditch survive.

== Literature ==
- Alfons Zettler, Thomas Zotz: Die Burgen im mittelalterlichen Breisgau. Halbband 1. A–K. Nördlicher Teil. In: Archäologie und Geschichte. Freiburger Forschungen zum ersten Jahrtausend in Südwestdeutschland, Heft 14. Jan Thorbecke Verlag, Ostfildern, 2003, ISBN 3-7995-7364-X, pp. 72–73.
