= Dreisam Valley =

Valley in Baden-Württemberg, Germany

Coordinates: 47°58′50″N 7°55′18″E

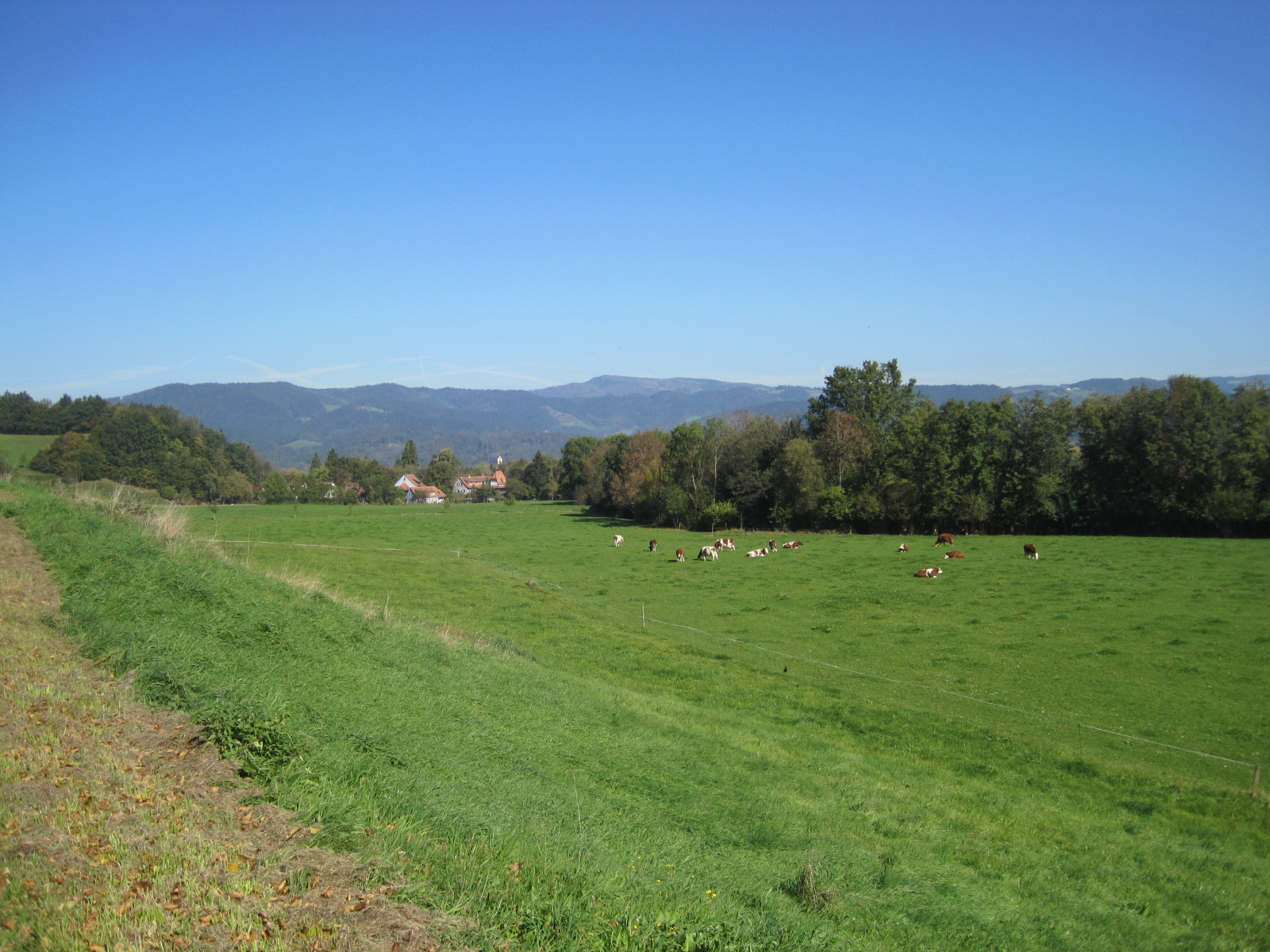
Cows grazing in the Dreisamtal

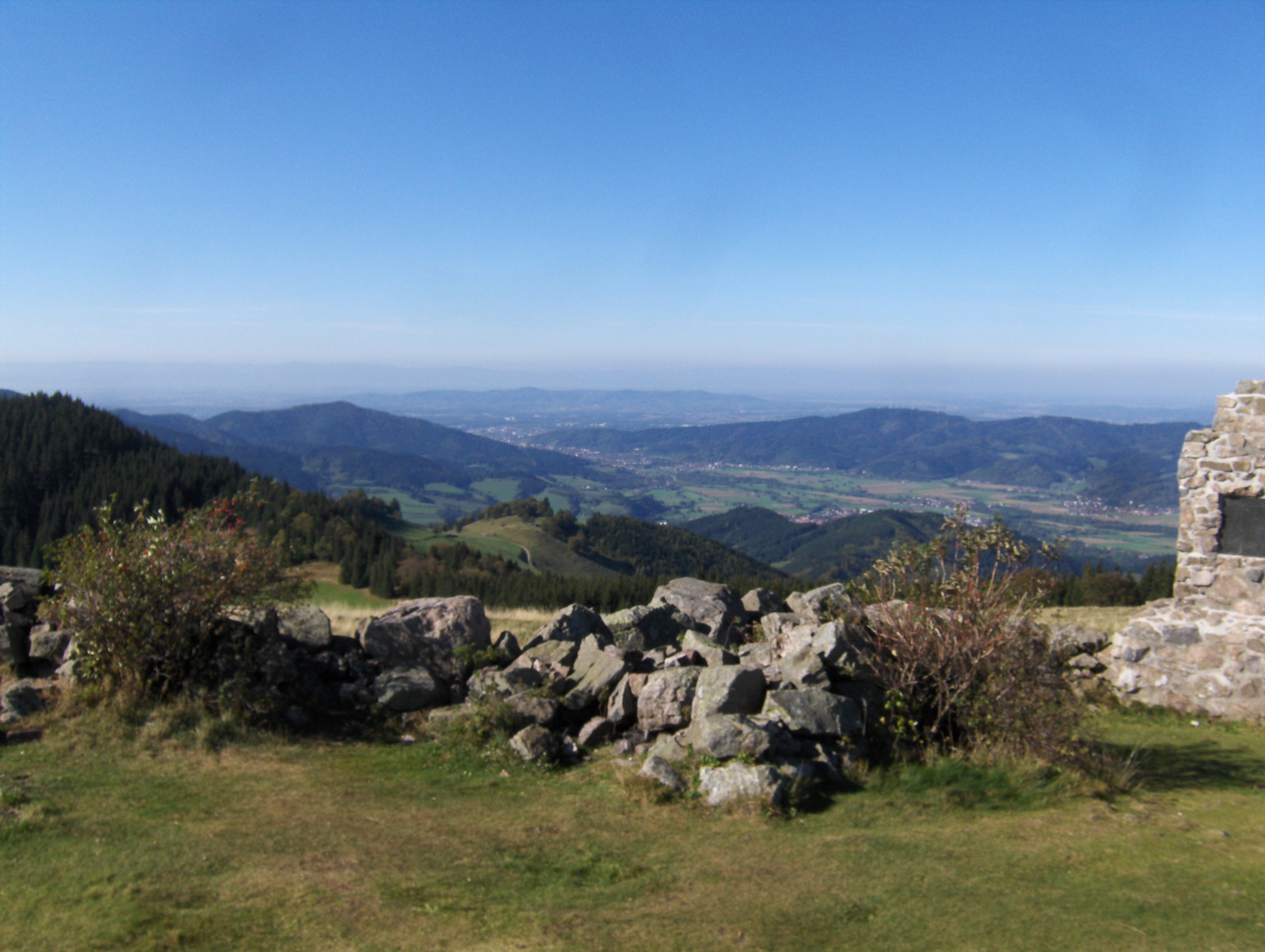
View of the valley from the Hinterwaldkopf

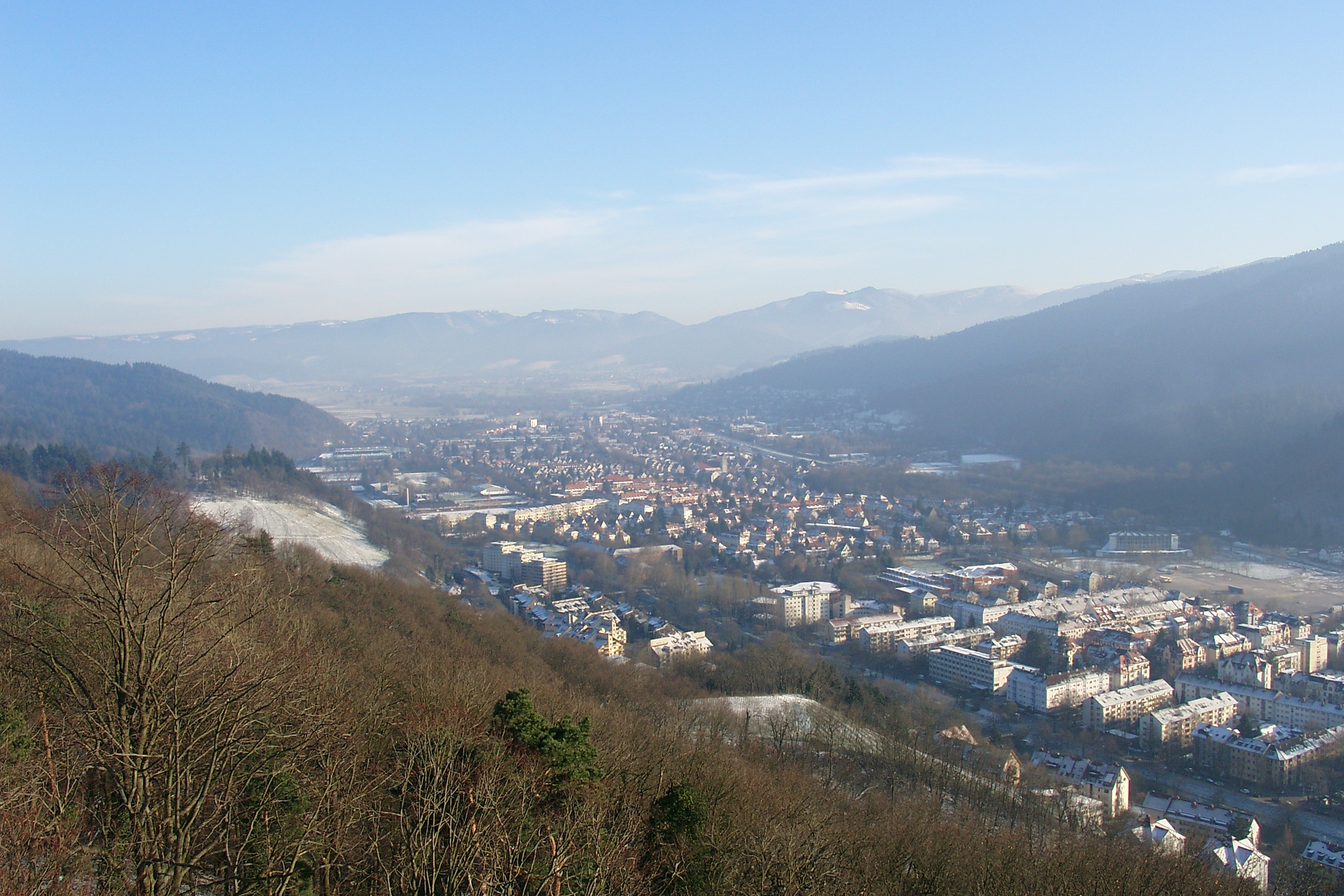
View of Freiburg towards the valley in winter

The Dreisam Valley (German: Dreisamtal) is a valley east of the south German city of Freiburg. The valley lies within the Southern Black Forest Nature Park in the state of Baden-Württemberg.

== Location ==
The Dreisam Valley runs for a few kilometres east of Freiburg, where it widens into a broad, level valley floor, the Zarten Basin (Zartener Becken). The main town of the valley is Kirchzarten which incorporates the village of Zarten, a settlement of Celtic origin (Tarodunum). Other places in the valley are Stegen, where the Eschbach valley from St. Peter joins, Buchenbach, where it meets the Wagensteig valley coming from St. Märgen and the Höllental valley which descends from Hinterzarten, and Oberried, where the Oberried valley joins from the Notschrei. The Freiburg subdistricts of Kappel, Ebnet and Littenweiler also lie within the Dreisamtal.

== Hydrology ==
The eponymous river flows through the Dreisam Valley, which was formed by sedimentary deposits from the inflowing streams that unite to form the Dreisam. More than 10 million m^{3} of groundwater are withdrawn from the whole of the valley every year, a considerable part of which provides drinking water for the city of Freiburg. The flat valley floor is therefore partly a water protection area (Wasserschutzgebiet). (by way of comparison, the annual groundwater outflow from the valley is less than 15 million m^{3}.)

== Transportation ==
The B 31 and the Höllentalbahn railway run through the Dreisam valley, each leading from Freiburg into the Black Forest.

== Tourism ==
For many tourists, the Dreisam valley is mainly known for its hiking and mountain biking trails through the Black Forest. The proximity to Freiburg as well as to neighbouring Alsace make the area a popular destination. The Schauinsland hill and the Feldberg, the highest mountain in the Black Forest, are easily accessible from the valley.

The four municipalities of Kirchzarten, Stegen, Buchenbach and Oberried have joined forces to promote the Dreisam Valley touristically.

== Landscape protection ==
Parts of the valley are designated as a landscape conservation area, from the eastern city limits of Freiburg to Buchenbach between the lower reaches of the Wagensteigbach stream and the lower reaches of the Rotbach brook.
