= Falkenstein Castle (Höllental) =

Ruined hill castle

- Burg Falkenstein
- Breitnau
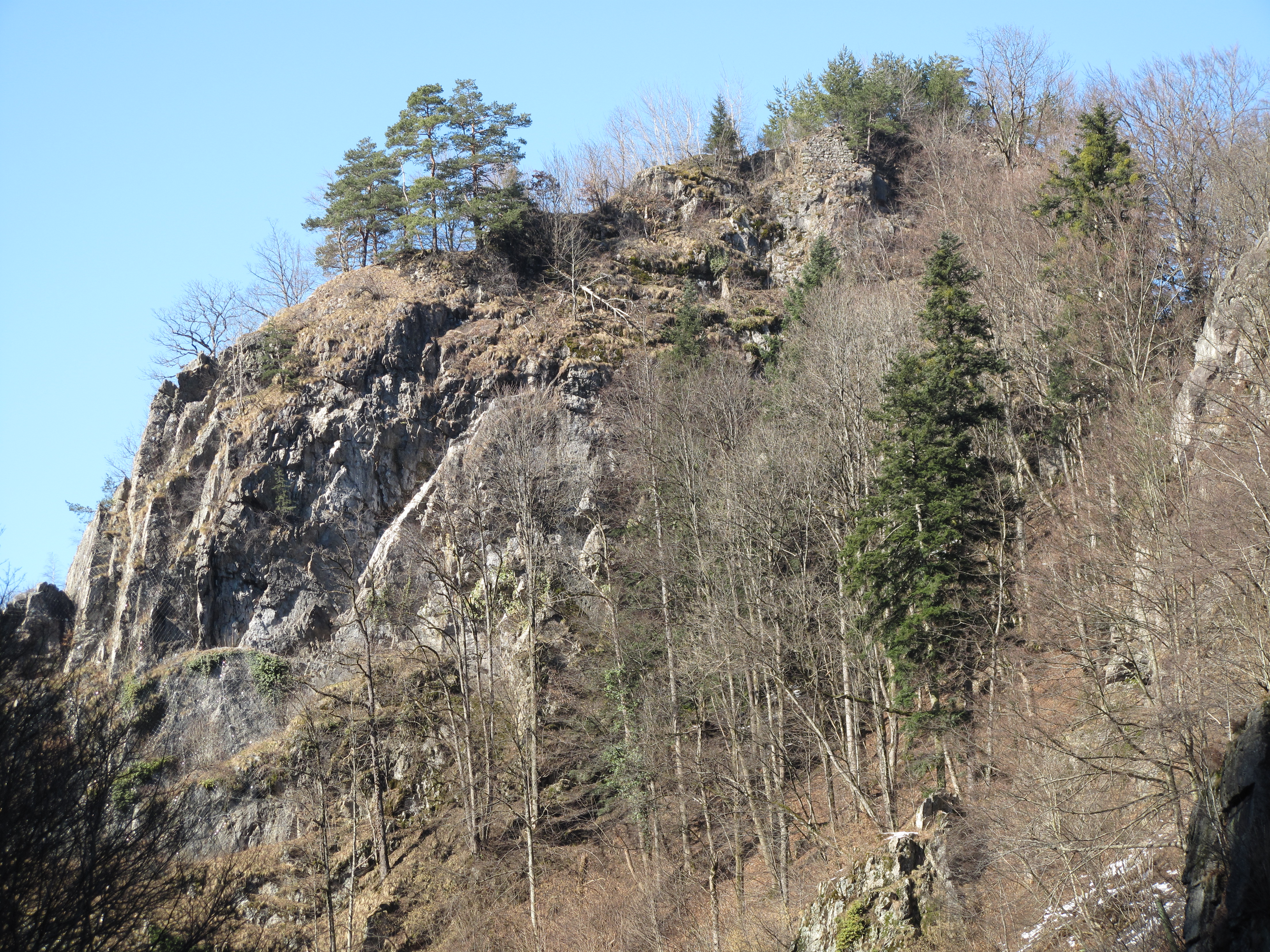
- Crag with the castle ruins on the upper castle plateau

Site information
- Type: hill castle
- Code: DE-BW
- Condition: ruin

Location
- Location within Baden-Württemberg Location within Germany
- Coordinates: 47°56′27″N 8°01′00″E
- Height: 617.6 m above sea level (NN)

Site history
- Built: around 1200

Garrison information
- Occupants: ministeriales

Falkenstein Castle (German: Burg Falkenstein) is a ruined hill castle near Freiburg im Breisgau on the territory of the present-day municipality Breitnau in the county of Breisgau-Hochschwarzwald in the German state of Baden-Württemberg. The castle site lies in a triangle formed by the entrance of the Höllental valley – the Lower Höllental and the Engenbach valley, not far from the Buchenbach village of Falkensteig, 617.6 m above sea level (NN) on a rocky crag that is very difficult to get to today. Of the castle itself only a few wall remains are left. It is one of the less well preserved ruins in the Breisgau.

== History ==
The castle may have been built around 1200 on a steep eminence at the lower entrance to the Höllental, also known as the Falkensteige, by a Zähringen ministerialis family. Its founders probably came from the Wittental valley from the lords of Weiler and Blankenberg and are first recorded from 1137 to 1148 as the lords of Falkenstein. In the ensuing period they rose to become one of the circle of important aristocratic families in the Breisgau. The valley was named Falkensteiner Tal after them and their castle, and only changed to Höllental later on. The castle was supposed to guard the important communication route through the valley which linked the Breisgau to the Baar region and Lake Constance. The lords of the castle soon reigned over an area that extended up the valley to Hinterzarten and Titisee. Other castles built by the Falkensteins were Falkenbühl Castle, Bickenreute near Kirchzarten and Bubenstein Castle, also called Neufalkenstein ("New Falkenstein").

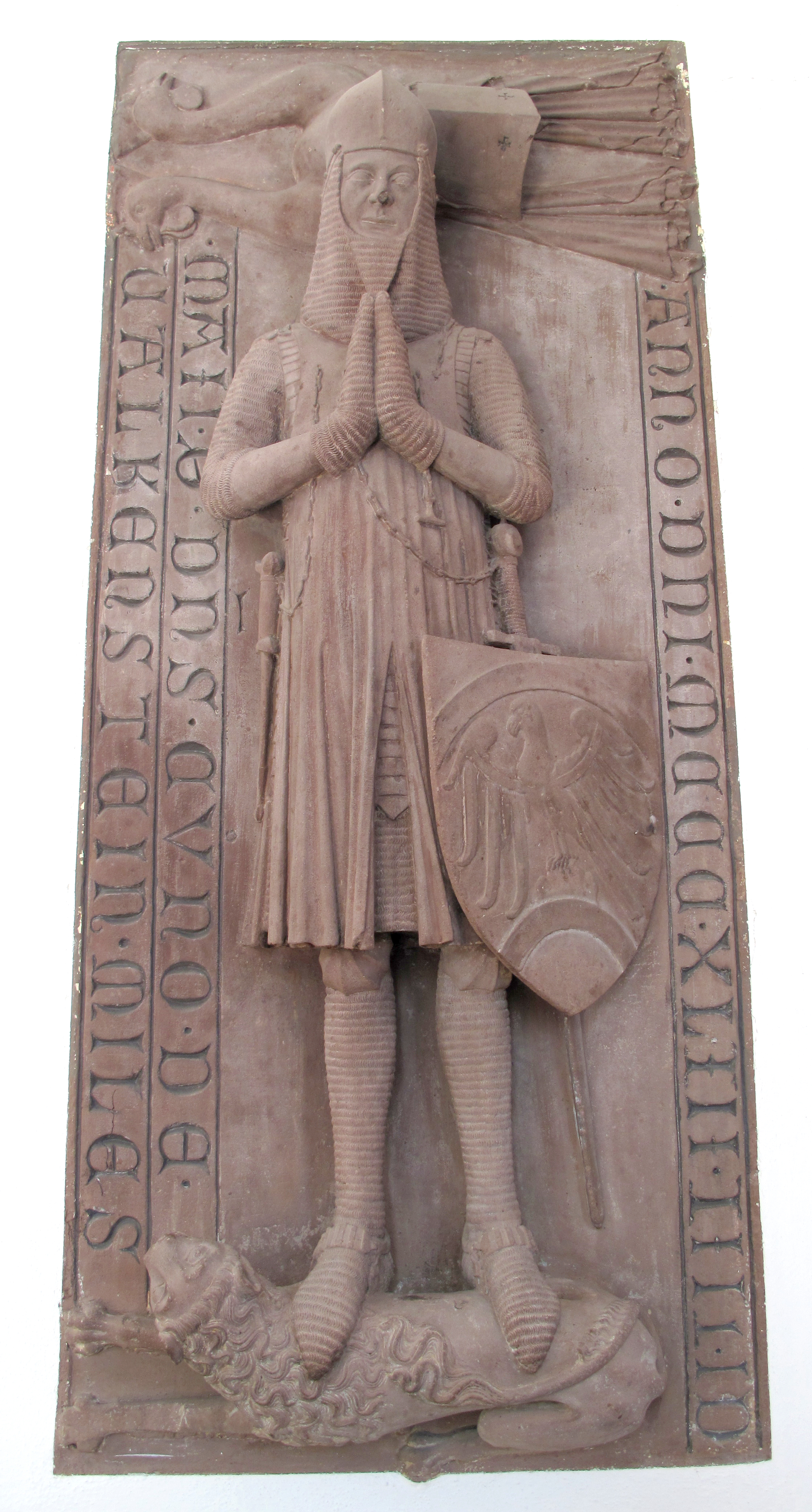
Gravestone of Sir Kuno of Falkenstein (died 1343) in Kirchzarten parish church, St. Gallus

After the toll road, which had brought the Falkensteins substantial revenue, met with competition from the route through the Wagensteig valley built in 1310–1379, according to legend, the knights are said to have operated more and more as robber barons. In a conflict between an aristocratic coalition under the leadership of Count Eberhard II of Württemberg against the Swabian League, Werner von Falkenstein, on the orders of his overlord, blocked roads and plundered the League's citizens.

Affected by the economic decline of the low nobility in the late 14th century, it was probably financial pressure that drove the Falkensteins to extend this approach to innocent travellers. This behaviour was the reason that, on 6 December 1388, Freiburg attacked and destroyed Falkenstein Castle. Other historians blame its destruction, however, on Freiburg's hunger for power. The castle chapel apparently survived the demise of the castle. In 1460, it is first mentioned as St. Nicholas' Chapel. In 1606 it was moved into the valley by the Höllenbach stream, today known as the Rotbach.

== Description ==
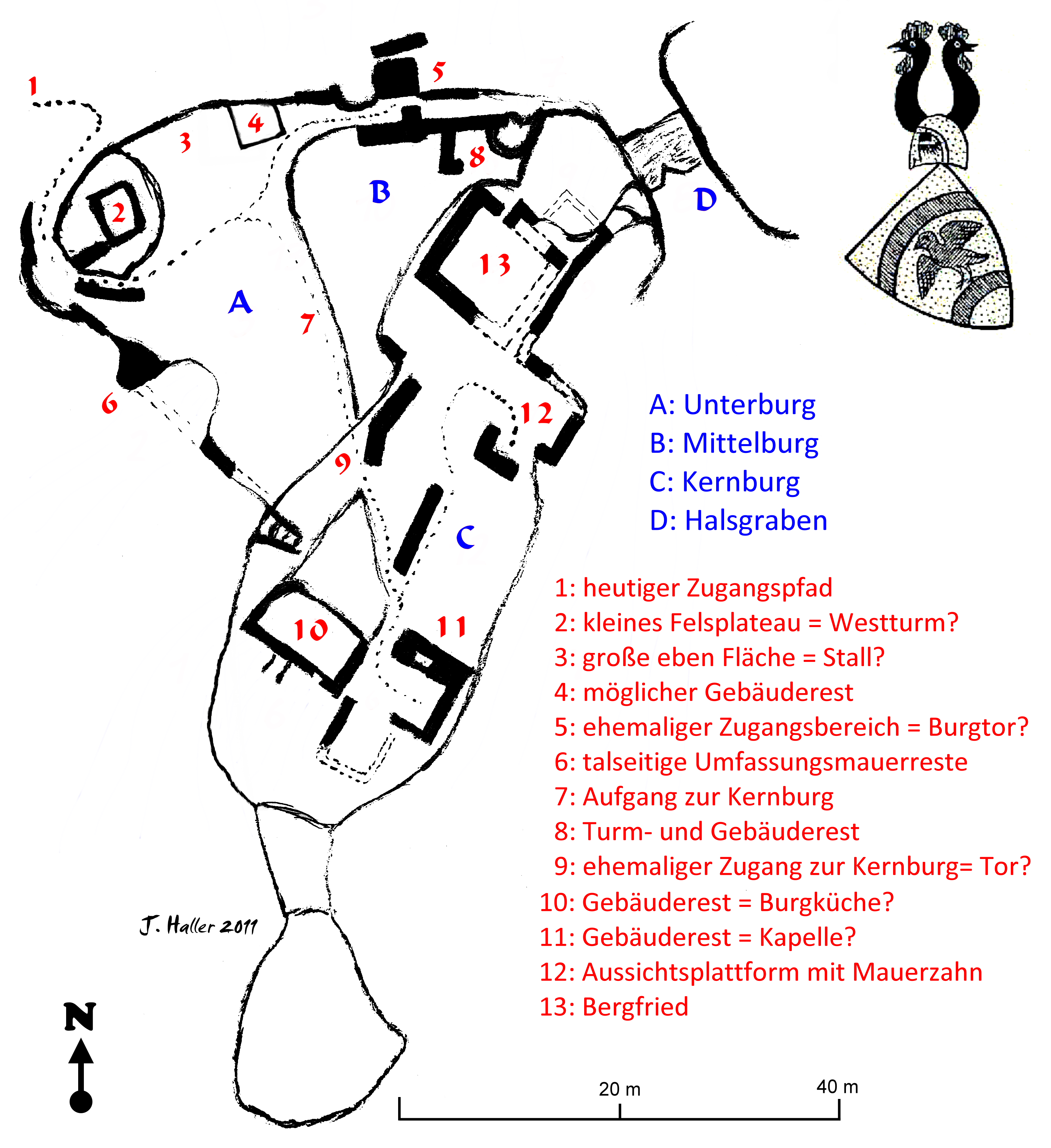
Plan of the Falkenstein castle site. Key: A: Lower Ward; B: Middle Ward; C: Inner Ward; D: Neck Ditch; 1: present access path; 2: small rock plateau = West Tower? 3: large flat area = Stables? 4: possible building remains; 5: former entrance area = Castle Gate? 6: valley-facing remains of the enceinte; 7: ascent to the Inner Ward; 8: Tower and building remains; 9: former entrance to the Inner Ward = Gate? 10: building remains = Kitchen? 11: building remains = Chapel? 12: viewing platform and projecting wall section; 13: Bergfried

The irregular and very inaccessible castle site rises through four levels. For simplicity, it will be described under four sections. First, is the lower ward (Unterburg, A) whose fragmented wall remains are up to six metres high and three metres thick, and run from the southwest side of the castle rock up to, and along, its northern flank. Here, there are more, very substantial, staggered sections of wall and what is assumed to be the old entrance area and castle gate (5) above the Engenbach valley and present day entrance at its western tip. (1)

Second, there is an adjoining neck ditch, about 20 metres long, 4 to 6 metres wide and up to 12 metres deep (D), cutting through the ridge to the northeast.

Third, is a small middle ward (Mittelburg, B) on a roughly six-metre-high rock step rising above the lower ward – which lies to its west and north – on the upper part of the castle rock, and extending northeast to a point above the neck ditch.

Fourth, is the upper ward (Oberburg) or inner ward (Kernburg) (C) on the ascending, elongated rocky ridge that is up to 55 metres long, between 12 and 16 metres wide and runs from southwest to northeast. Among other large sections of surviving wall at the south and southwestern tip are: a wall about ten metres long and three metres high facing the valley which is believed to belong to the castle kitchen (10); another wall, six metres wide and about 2.5 metres high (11), which could be the site of the chapel; a further prominent, tooth-like wall in the centre on the southeastern cliff edge – easily visible from the Höllental valley when approaching from Hirschsprung – and finally the remains of a quadrangle with walls measuring about nine by nine metres – probably the former bergfried – on a lofty site at the northeastern end of the castle rock.

== Literature ==
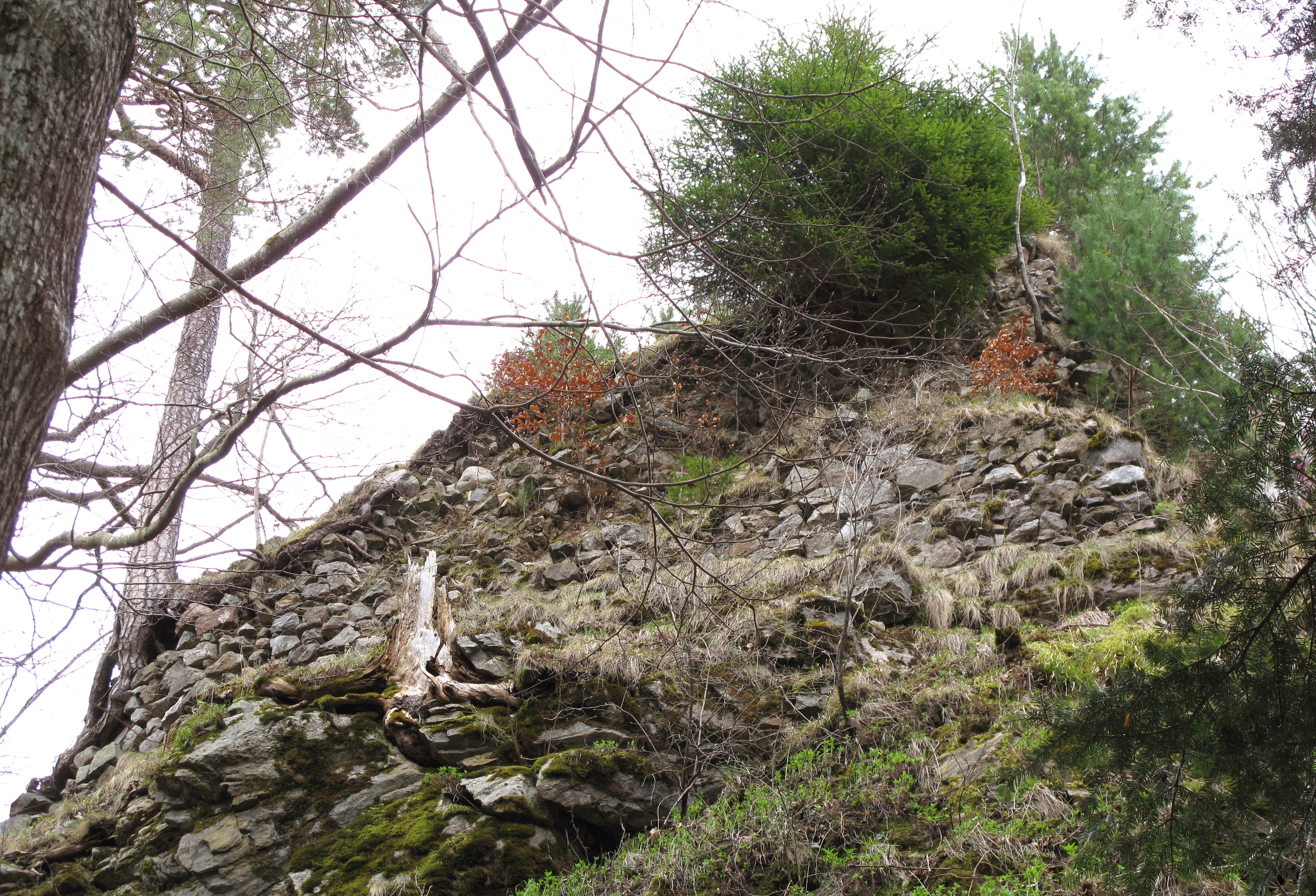
Northwestern foundation wall remains of the bergfried

- Max Miller: Handbuch der Historischen Stätten Deutschlands, Bd. 6: Baden-Württemberg, Stuttgart, 1965.
- H. Mayer: Falkenstein und die Falkensteiner, in: Breisgauer Chronik 6, 1914.
- Alfons Zettler, Thomas Zotz: Die Burgen im mittelalterlichen Breisgau. Halbband 1. A - K. Nördlicher Teil. Ostfildern. In. Archäologie und Geschichte. Freiburger Forschungen zum ersten Jahrtausend in Südwestdeutschland, Heft 14. Jan Thorbecke Verlag, Sigmaringen, 2003, ISBN 3-7995-7364-X, pp. 57–62.
- Arthur Hauptmann: Burgen einst und jetzt. Burgen und Burgruinen in Südbaden. Verlag des Südkuriers, 2nd vol., Konstanz, 1984.
