= Hirschsprung (Black Forest) =

Coordinates: 47°56′16″N 8°1′13″E

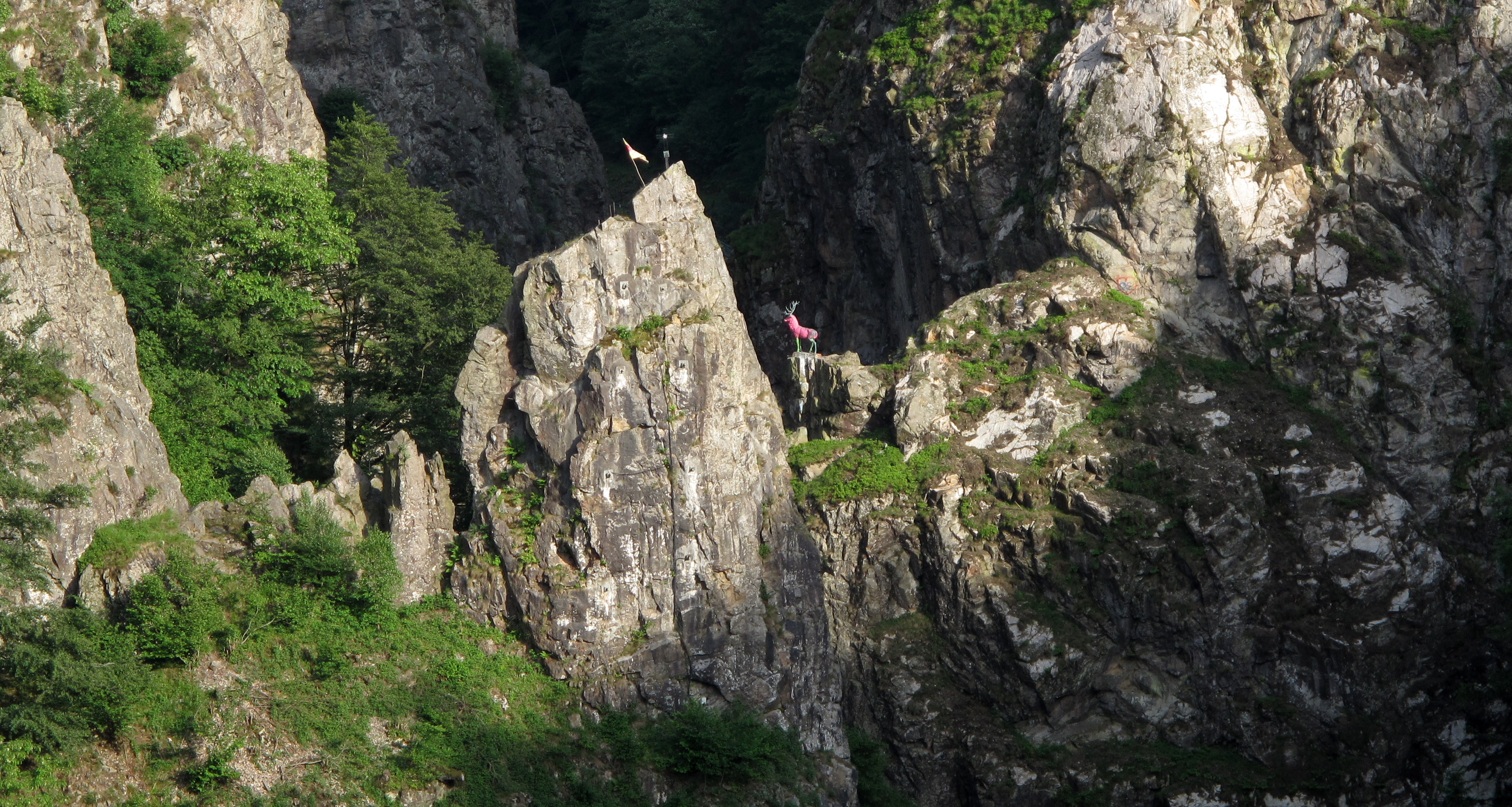
Höllenpass gorge from the north with stag monument on the south side

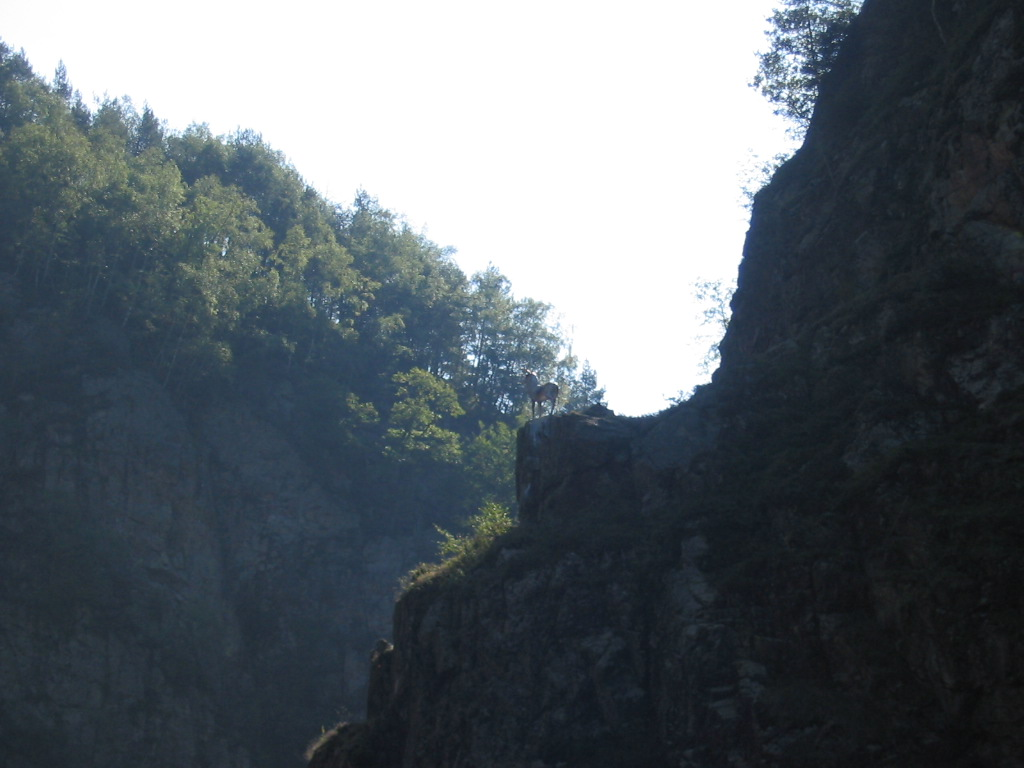
Stag monument seen from the road

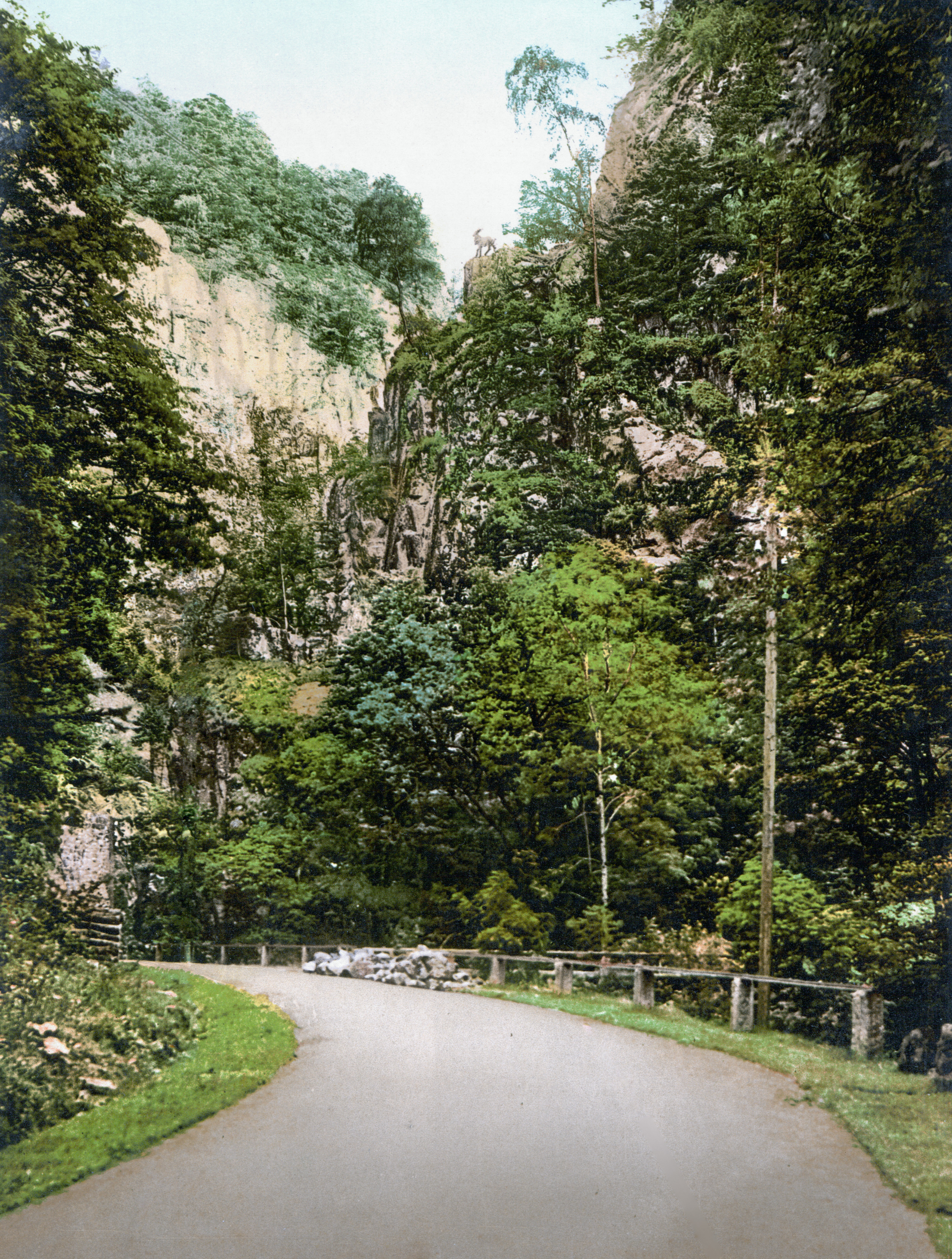
Hirschsprung around 1900

The Black Forest Hirschsprung (German: Schwarzwälder Hirschsprung) is a legend from the Höllental valley in the Black Forest in Germany. Over time the name has passed from the legend to a place in the valley.

== Description ==
The name means "stag leap" and it is a narrow, gorge-like section of the ravine-shaped central portion of the Höllental ("hell valley") with rock faces up to 130 metres high. It is also called the Höllenpass ("hell pass"). It is located on the parish boundary between Breitnau and Buchenbach. The Hirschsprung gorge was only 9 metres wide before the upgrade of the road. The southern Hirschsprung rocks have been tunnelled under by the Jägerpfad ("Jäger’s path"), which ran alongside the Höllenbach (or Rotbach) stream, but has been closed since 2009 due to the danger of falling rocks and rockface collapse.

Eight hundred metres up the valley is the station on the Höllental Railway that is named after the Hirschsprung. Today it is only used as a crossing loop and is not open to passengers. The large size of the station is due to the fact that additional locomotives used to be coupled onto trains here in order to pull or push them up the ramp to Hinterzarten.

Until 2001 there was a kiosk below the Hirschsprung at the eponymous car park along the B 31 road.

== Legend ==
According to the legend, a knight from nearby Falkenstein Castle went on a deer hunt in the Höllental valley. After some time he sighted a splendid stag and took up the chase. But the stag made it difficult for him, because he was fast and agile; nevertheless the hunter did not give up and pressed on after the animal. Driven by fear of death the stag sprang in a mighty leap over the gorge and thus escaped his pursuer.

Today such an event is hardly conceivable in view of the width of the gorge at this point, but at the time it would not have been entirely impossible for the gorge was only 9 metres wide and a stag could jump up to ten metres.

== Stag monument ==
In 1856 the parish of Falkensteig erected a wooden stage on the occasion of the wedding of Grand Duke Frederick of Baden and Princess Louise of Prussia . In 1874 forest taxator, Schilling, had a new stag put up. This occasion was the first Gathering of German Foresters (Versammlung der deutschen Forstmänner) in Freiburg. After this monument was destroyed in a storm, in 1887 the last wooden monument was put up on the rocks. It lasted until 1904.

In 1907 donations enabled a 350 kg and 2.50-metre-high bronze stag to be erected It was designed by a sculptor named Günther and made in the Heidelberg Zinc Ornaments Factory.

When, in 2010, the Höllental was closed to traffic for four weeks, the forestry commission used the opportunity to lift the stag off the hill on 6 August using a crane lorry. The foresters responsible for Falkenstein took 130 hours to remove the five layers of colour and repair the stag which had numerous bullet holes - around 35 entry holes and about 70 exit holes - and a sawn-off leg. The entry holes were already oxidised, hence it is suspected that it was made between the end of the war and the early post-war period. The reason for the number of exit holes being double the number of entry holes is because the bullets were split by iron rods in the interior before exiting through the external bronze skin. In addition a wasp’s nest was found inside the sculpture. The monument was painted green and a time capsule was placed inside that commemorated the restoration. On 10 October the stag was placed on a trailer and transported from Himmelreich (part of Buchenbach) to the Red Deer Days in Häusern as part of a Red Stag Tour (Tour de Rothirsch) with stops in Feldberg, Schluchsee and St. Blasien. After the stag had been placed on display there from 15 to 18 October, it was replaced in the gorge on 23 October 2010. The neckerchief that was placed on the stag’s antlers at the re-erection ceremony had been tied on by Landrätin Dorothea Störr-Ritter at the tour auftakt in Himmelreich. In addition to her Waldshut colleague, Tilman Bollacher, several mayors from the participating municipalities were present.

After the 2011 state elections in Baden-Württemberg and the green-red coalition government that resulted, unknown people painted the stag green and red. Later the colours were changed again; it was decorated with wings and almost went into competition with the Holbeinpferd in Freiburg.

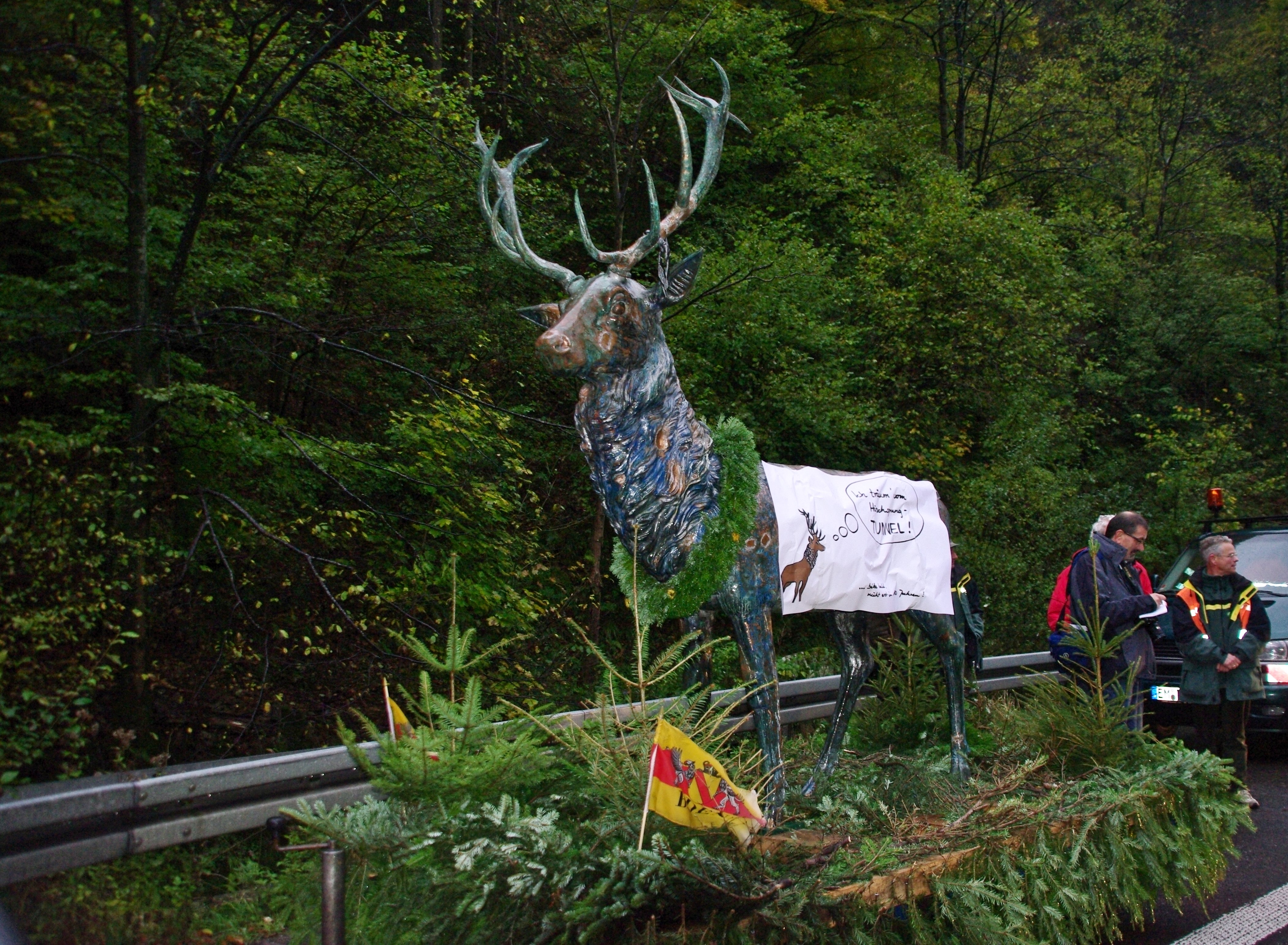
The restored monument before its erection

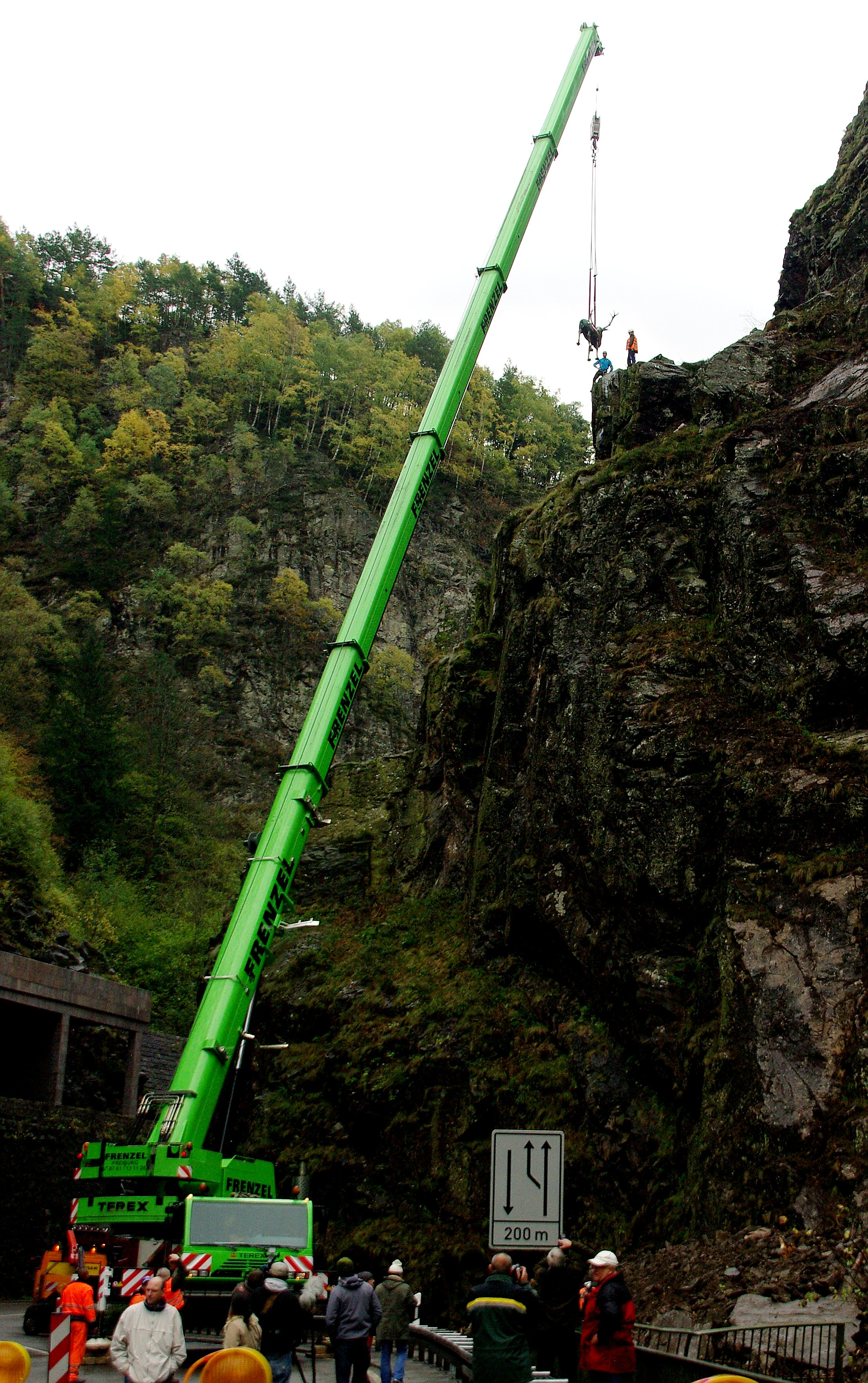
The stag on the way to its site

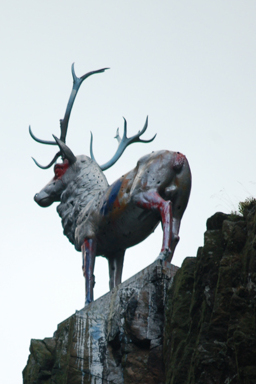
The stag monument today
