= Erwin Dold =

Erwin Dold (16 November 1919, in Wagensteig, Weimar Republic – 11 September 2012, in Buchenbach, Germany) was a fighter pilot in the Luftwaffe, then sergeant-major in the Luftwaffe ground staff, Commandant of the Dautmergen Concentration Camp, and director of the lumber company Dold Holzwerke in Buchenbach.

== Early life ==
Dold was born in Wagensteig in the Black Forest region of southern Germany in 1919, and was connected to his family's lumber mill from his earliest years. The outbreak of World War II prevented him from officially joining the company, and he instead was trained as a fighter pilot in the German air force, seeing action in France, Romania, and the Soviet Union, before being shot down over Crimea. He was seriously wounded and transferred to the ground staff in Freiburg im Breisgau after his recovery.

Dold was sent as to the concentration camp Haslach im Kinzigtal to serve as commander. After its closure in autumn of 1944, Dold was transferred to the concentration camp in Dautmergen, one of the sub-camps of the Natzweiler-Struthof concentration camp. Its main purpose was the mining of oil shale, gained under grossly inhumane conditions.

== Commandant at Dautmergen ==
The catastrophic situation of the inmates appalled the 24-year-old officer; the barracks stood on a swampy field and had no floor. The mortality rate, primarily from typhus and paratyphus, stood at up to 50 dead per day. At Dold's request, a sanitary inspection commission was called in to examine the hygienic and medical facilities, resulting in the transfer of the commandant.

On 7 March 1945 Dold himself became the camp commandant. He distinguished himself through his humane conduct, saw to it that prisoners received clothing and food and improved the hygiene conditions. In various sorties, he managed to procure food with the help of a small groups of prisoners he had organised to help him, and with the financial assistance of his father, who ran the family firm. When ordered by the Gestapo to organise a firing squad for the execution of 23 Soviet officers between 5 and 7 April 1945, he refused to do so. That same month the camp was evacuated, few remaining prisoners were liberated by the French army.

Dold gave himself up voluntarily to the French army and was interned with 24 other defendants accused of crimes against humanity. On 1 February 1947, on the basis of witness testimony by prisoners, he was acquitted as the sole concentration camp commandant on the grounds of "proven innocence."

== Post-war years ==
After the war, Dold joined his father's company, which he later took over. For over 40 years he remained silent about the events of the war until in 1990, he spoke to Dr Thomas Seiterich. A year later a documentary movie was made for German television by Manfred Bannenberg.

On 8 November 2002, Dold was made citizen of honour of Buchenbach.

In preparation for the film "Himmel und Erde" by Christian Schumacher, with the French actor Gérard Depardieu situated in Schömberg, he was able give sound advice for the film script. Dold is played in the film by Matthias Schweighöfer.

On 11 September 2012, Dold died in his home town at the age of 92.

== Literature ==
- Yveline Pendaries, Les Procès de Rastatt (1946-1954). Le jugement des crimes de guerre en zone française d'occupation en Allemagne, Peter Lang, 1995, p. 189.
- Thomas Seiterich-Kreuzkamp: Der Fall Erwin Dold. In: Michael Kißener (Ed.): Widerstand gegen die Judenverfolgung. Universitätsverlag Konstanz, Konstanz 1996, ISBN 3-87940-511-5, S. 261–283.
- Edwin Ernst Weber: Opfer des Unrechts: Stigmatisierung, Verfolgung und Vernichtung von Gegnern durch die NS-Gewaltherrschaft an Fallbeispielen aus Oberschwaben. Thorbecke 2009, ISBN 3-799-51070-2.

== Film ==
- Manfred Bannenberg: Der KZ-Kommandant. Die ungewöhnliche Geschichte des Erwin Dold, Dokumentarfilm, Deutschland 1991.
- Christian Schumacher: Himmel und Erde, Deutschland 2012, mit Matthias Schweighöfer, Anna-Maria Mühe und Gérard Depardieu
