= Buchenbach =

- Municipality
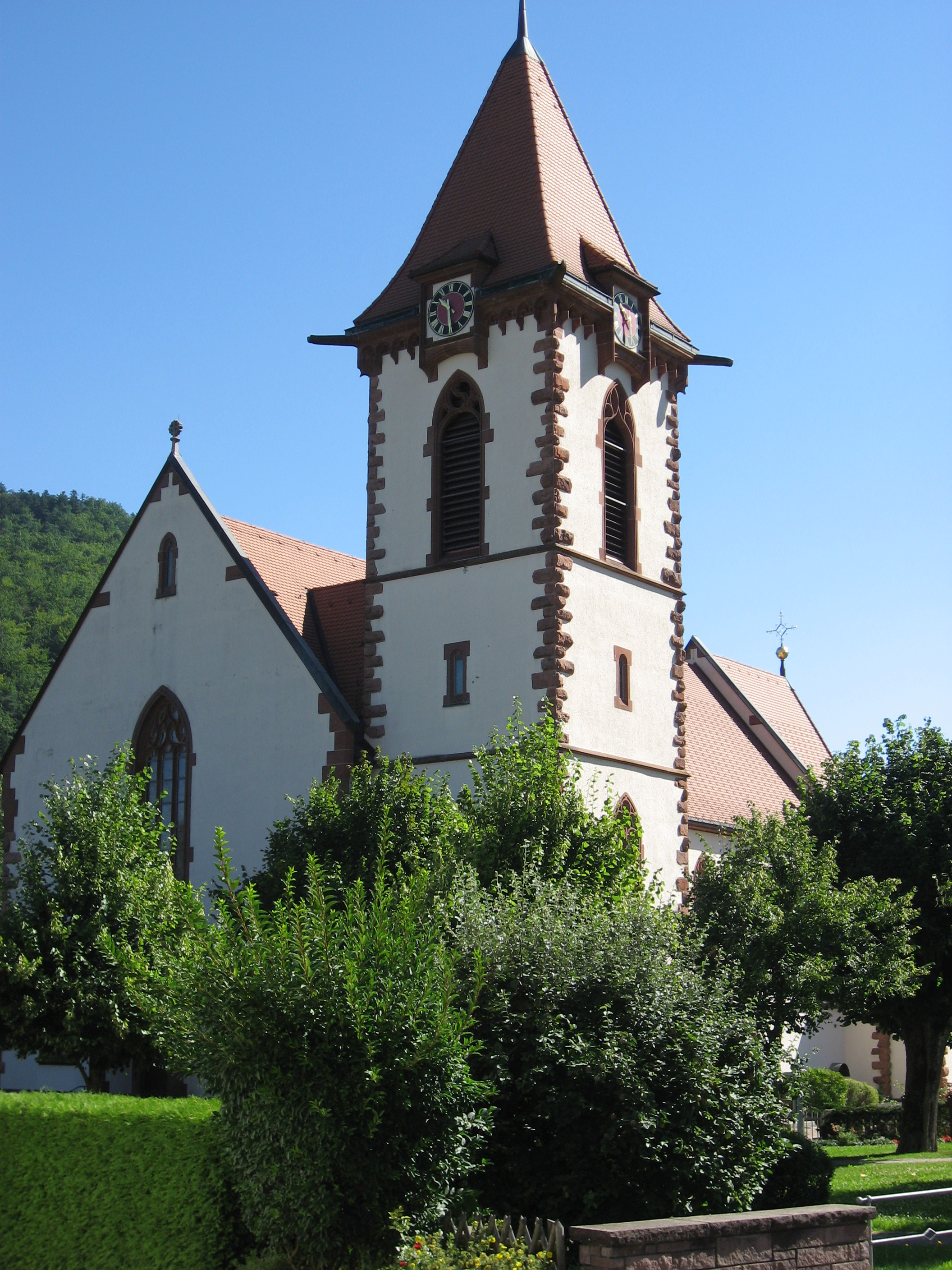
- Buchenbach parish church

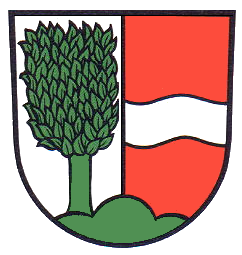
- Coat of arms

- Location of Buchenbach within Breisgau-Hochschwarzwald district
- Interactive map of Buchenbach
- Location within Germany Location within Baden-Württemberg
- Coordinates: 47°57′39″N 08°00′34″E
- Country: Germany
- State: Baden-Württemberg
- Admin. region: Freiburg
- District: Breisgau-Hochschwarzwald
- Subdivisions: 4 communities

Government
  - Mayor (2020–28): Ralf Kaiser

Area
  - Total: 38.99 km^{2} (15.05 sq mi)
- Elevation: 420–1,156 m (1,378–3,793 ft)

Population (2025-12-31)
  - Total: 3,153
  - Density: 80.87/km^{2} (209.4/sq mi)
- Time zone: UTC+01:00 (CET)
  - Summer (DST): UTC+02:00 (CEST)
- Postal codes: 79256
- Dialling codes: 07661
- Vehicle registration: FR
- Website: www.buchenbach.de

Buchenbach is a municipality in the south west of the Black Forest in Germany. It is located in the district of Breisgau-Hochschwarzwald in Baden-Württemberg. It is made up of four communities, the main town of Buchenbach and the villages of Falkensteig, Unteribental and Wagensteig. The current municipality was formed by the merger of the former entities of Buchenbach and Falkensteig on 1 December 1971, with Wagensteig being joined to them on 1 August 1973 and Unteribental on 1 January 1975.

== Geography ==
The municipality is located within the South Black Forest Natural Park, about 12 km as the crow flies east of Freiburg im Breisgau. It stretches from the lower end of the Höllental, below Rotbach to the valley of the Wagensteigbach, and Unteribental borders the St. Märgen plateau. A little to the west of Buchenbach, these two mountain streams merge to form the Dreisam, so Buchenbach is the starting point of the Dreisam valley.

=== Neighbouring municipalities ===
Clockwise from the north, Buchenbach borders on the municipalities of Sankt Peter, St. Märgen, Breitnau, Oberried, Kirchzarten and Stegen.

== History ==
=== Buchenbach and Wiesneck ===
Lying in the lower Wagensteig valley, Buchenbach is made up of numerous small settlements and isolated farmsteads. Constituent settlements include Ober- and Unterbuchenbach, and the village of Wiesneck, which was independent of the town until 1837. Wiesneck is in fact the oldest part of the municipality, with a castle that is first documented in 1079. This was owned by the counts of Haigerloch-Wiesneck. In 1118, Bruno von Haigerloch-Wiesneck founded the monastery of St. Märgen. The Haigerloch-Wiesneck line died out in 1170, and the castle fell into the possession of a branch of the Zollerns, who styled themselves as Counts of Hoheberg. In 1293 they sold the castle. In 1577 it fell into the possession of the Barons of Sickingen-Hohenburg. The castle was sacked in 1121 by the Zähringers and in 1646, during the Thirty Years War, by the French. Wiesneck grew up as a small settlement around the castle. Since the location fell within the state of Baden, Baron Wilhelm von Sickingen eventually sold his overlordship of the village to the state of Baden, which joined it to the larger town of Buchenbach.

Buchenbach itself is first heard of in 1350. It was an Austrian possession, and from 1653 by the Barons of Sickingen owning most of the land. The settlements of Ober- und Unterbuchenbach were under different overlords, causing continual difficulties and disputes, so that there were numerous reorganizations of the municipality down to the 19th century.

=== Falkensteig ===
The village derives its name from the Falkenstein Castle built in the 12th century by the lords of Falkenstein and destroyed in 1388 by the townspeople of Freiburg. In the 17th century, the area fell into the possession of the lords of Pfirt, and subsequently to the state of Baden. An attempt to join it to Buchenbach in the 19th century failed.

=== Unteribental ===
Unteribental was founded in 1120 and was under the Zähringers. Subsequently, it was merged into Stegen. In 1827, however, it became independent again. From the time it came under the authority of the state of Baden in 1806, it was treated as part of the Freiburg district.

=== Wagensteig ===
Wagensteig is first heard of in 1125, at which time it belonged to the St. Märgen monastery. After the secularisation mandated by the German Mediatisation it came under the authority of the state of Baden, from 1819 forming part of the Freiburg district. One of the oldest routes from the Neckar and Danube regions across the Black Forest to the Rhine Valley passes through the Wagensteig valley. The name of the valley itself comes from Wagenstadt ("cart town"), the form "Wagensteig" first appearing in the 12th century, in a judgement by Bishop Ulrich of Konstanz in a conflict between the church in Zarten and the monastery at St. Märgen over the rights to tithes in the district. The bishop concluded that the tithes from everywhere up to the town "Waginstat" should go to St. Märgen.

== Politics ==
=== Municipal council ===
Following the municipal elections of 13 June 2004, the local council is made up as follows:

| CDU | 45,0% | +3,0 | 7 Sitze | ±0 |
| UWG | 38,1% | −19,9 | 5 Sitze | −4 |
| SPD | 16,9% | +16,9 | 2 Sitze | +2 |

Along with the neighbouring municipalities of Kirchzarten, Oberried and Stegen, Buchenbach belongs to the Gemeindeverwaltungsverband Dreisamtal (Dreisam Valley Authority), whose offices are in Kirchzarten.

=== Arms ===
Above three hills vert (green), vertically divided; dexter (right) argent (white), with a beech tree vert (green) above the dexter hill, sinister (left) gules with a wavy fess argent (white) bordered sable (black). Flag: green and white.

== Economy and infrastructure ==
=== Transport ===
On the western border of the municipality is the Himmelreich station on the Höllentalbahn, with a half-hourly service throughout the day to Freiburg im Breisgau and on into the Black Forest, alternately to Neustadt and Seebrugg on the Schluchsee.

In the west of Buchenbach, the Bundesstraße B31 (Breisach–Lindau trunk road), the most important link between Freiburg im Breisgau, the Black Forest and Lake Constance, runs through the village of Falkenstein. The Landesstrasse L128 provincial highway runs around the edge of the municipality, through the Wagensteig valley and on to St. Märgen and Thurner. A more direct route to Thurner branches off between Buchenbach and Wagensteig, as the local road K4907 through the Spirzen valley.

=== Industry ===
The main employers are:

- Holzwerke Dold GmbH, a sawmill and producer of furniture and building materials, employing about 250 people;
- Siko GmbH, makers of measuring instruments, with about 140 employees

Buchenbach also offers facilities to Black Forest tourists. The Freiburg-Lake Constance Black Forest Trail, a long-distance footpath, passes through the main town.

== People ==
=== Honorary citizens ===
- Oskar Saier, former Roman Catholic Archbishop of Freiburg, was born in Wagensteig

=== Other people associated with the municipality ===
- Alfred Döblin was treated in the Husemann clinic.
- Erwin Dold (1919–2012), German concentration camp commandant in World War 2
