= Abbey of St. Märgen =

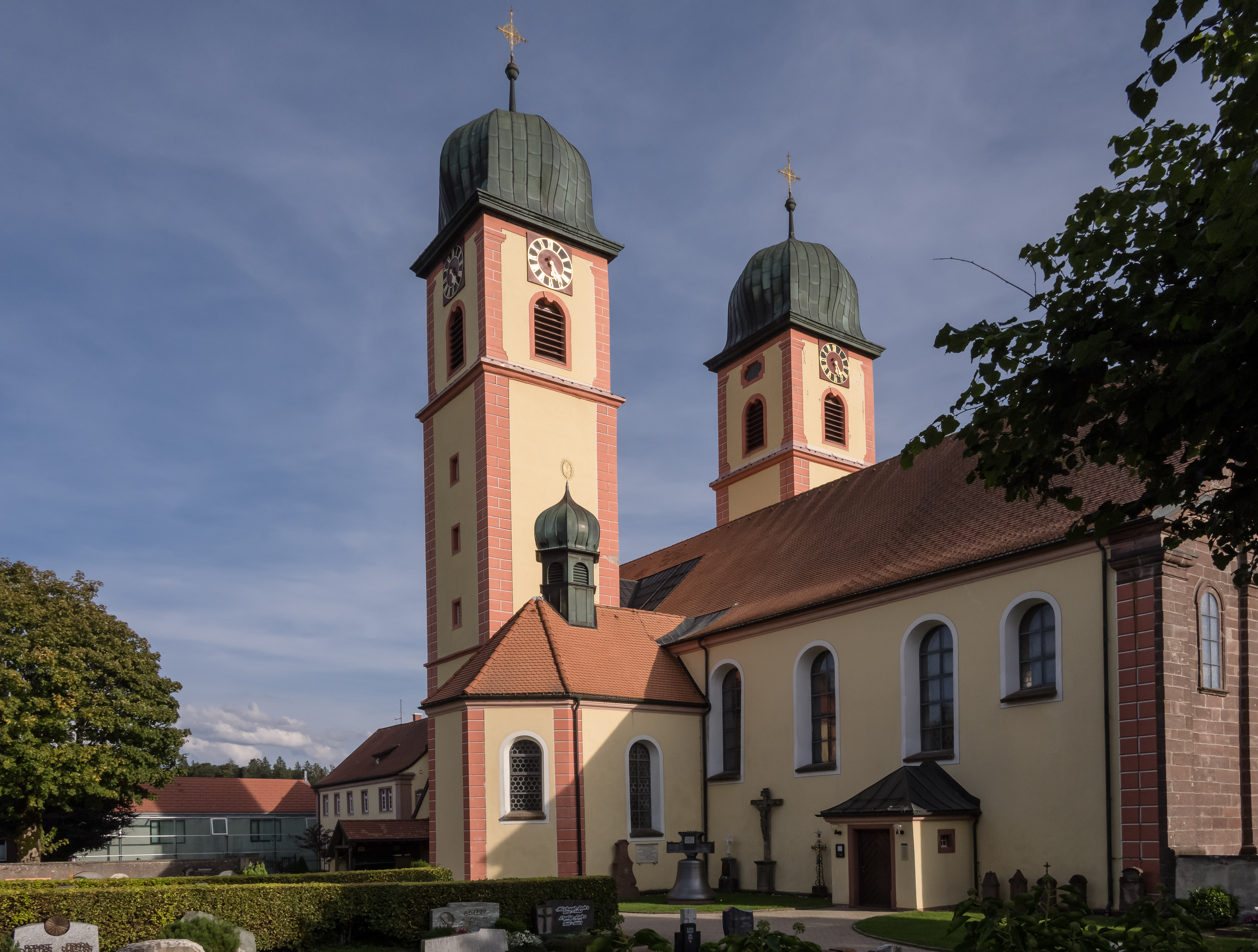
- Interactive map of Abbey of St. Märgen

Monastery information
- Order: Augustinian canons
- Established: c. 1118
- Disestablished: 1806
- Dedicated to: St. Mary of the Assumption (church)

Site
- Location: St. Märgen in the Black Forest, Baden-Württemberg, Germany
- Coordinates: 48°00′22″N 8°05′32″E

The Abbey of St. Märgen (German: Kloster St. Märgen) is a former Augustinian canons monastery in St. Märgen in the Black Forest in Germany, which was founded around 1118 under the name Cella Sanctae Mariae ("Chapel of St. Mary"). The German form of the name, Maria-Zell, changed over the centuries through Marienzell, Sante Merien and St. Mergen to the present name of the abbey and village, St. Märgen. The Baroque abbey church of St. Mary of the Assumption (Mariä Himmelfahrt) is today the Roman Catholic parish church of St. Märgen and one of the most important Marian pilgrimage churches in the Archdiocese of Freiburg.

The history of the abbey has been researched in depth, especially by church historian Wolfgang Müller (1905–1983), the priest and art historian Manfred Hermann, the teacher and historian, Elisabeth Irtenkauf (born 1931 in Rottweil) and St. Märgen's sexton and local historian, Klaus Hog (born 1966 in Freiburg im Breisgau).

The abbey was destroyed five times by fire, the first time in 1284 or shortly before and the last time in 1907. It was rebuilt or restored five times.

In art history it has a special significance because one of the most important rococo woodcarvers in southern Germany, Matthias Faller, lived and worked here for a while.

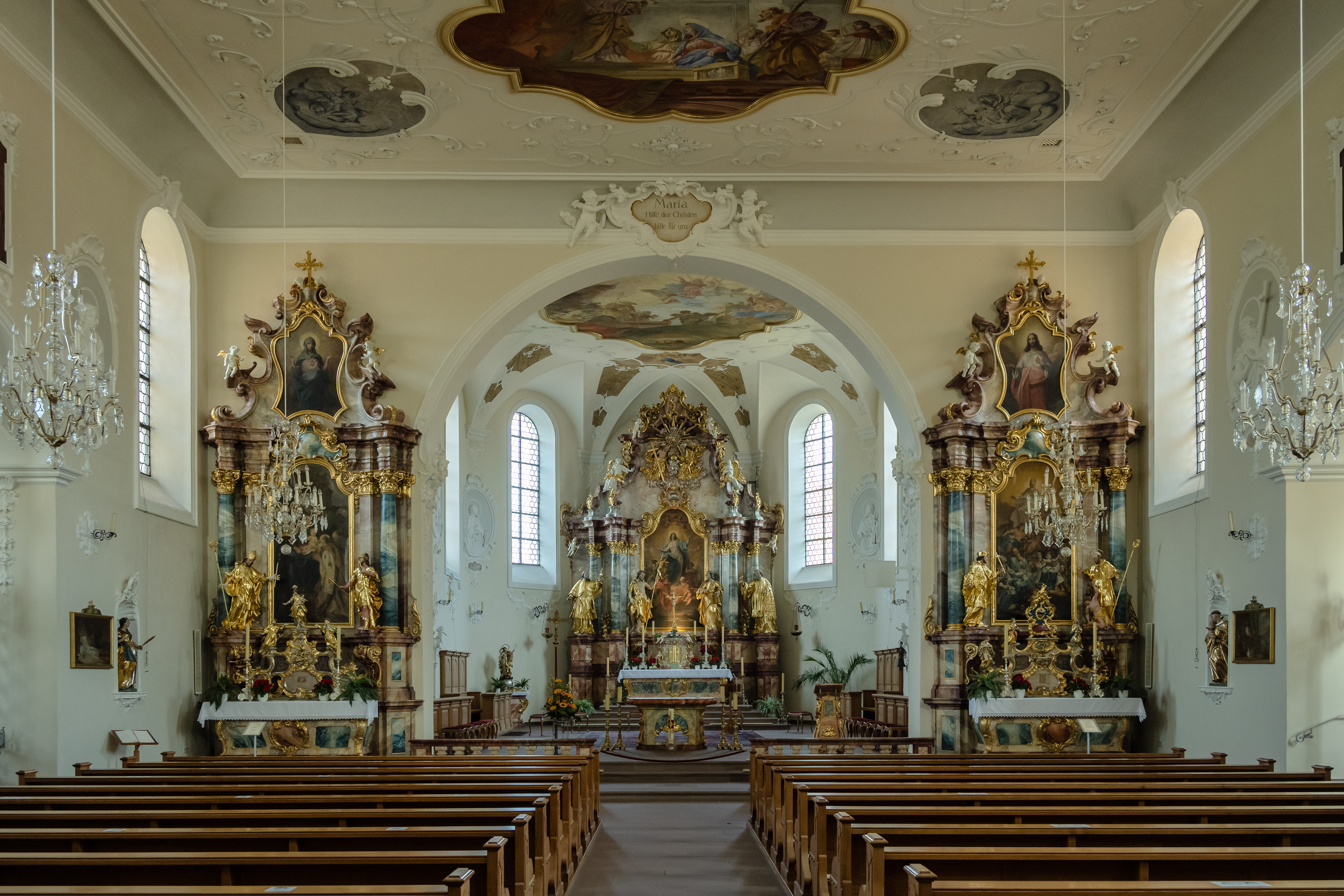
Interior of the church

== List of superiors of St. Märgen and All Saints ==
This list is extracted from the work by Wolfgang Müller (1969) and also contained in Irtenkauf and Hog (2010). It is divided into superiors before and after the union of 1370.

=== Abbots of St. Märgen before the Union ===
- Dietrich (no date)
- Otto (1125)
- Hartmann (1145)
- H. (1215, 1217)
- Konrad I (1244, 1258)
- Werner (1265, 1277)
- Konrad II (1284, 1294)
- Peter I (1297, 1300)
- Dietmar of Hunaweier (1308, 1322)
- Johannes I (1329–1340)
- Konrad III (1340–1355; murdered)
- Werner of Weisweil (1356–1370; resigned)

=== Provosts of All Saints before the Union ===
- Hermann (1300, 1302)
- Werner (1329)
- Heinrich Wibeler (1306, 1311)
- Johannes (1314, 1315)
- Konrad (1316, 1324)
- Werner (1329)
- Heinrich Melvinger (1335, 1357)
- Nikolaus of Hochdorf (Freiburg im Breisgau) (1358–1370)
- Bertold Schultheiß of Hüfingen 1370

=== Abbots of St. Märgen and Provosts of All Saints ===
- Bertold Schultheiß of Hüfingen (1370–1385; murdered)
- Johannes II Schlegele (1388–1401; murdered)
- Johannes III Baldinger (1401–1407)
- Johannes IV Stempfer (1407–1424)
- Peter II Zimmermann (1428–1430)
- Rudolf Müller from Villingen (1436, 1437)
- Antonius Schreiber (1437–1451)
- Johannes V Zimmermann from Villingen (1453–1461)
- Johannes VI Fähr (1461–1474)
- Erhart Rotkopf from Rottweil (1474–1502)
- Lukas Wetzel from Herrenberg (1503–1516)
- Leonhard Wolf (1517–1537)

=== Administrators of All Saints ===
- Mattheus Haber or Haberkalt (1540, 1546)
- Heinrich of Jestetten (1546−1573; resigned)
- Michael Pantelin from Günzburg (1573–1574)
- Ulrich Stehelin from Hagnau am Bodensee (1574–1609; 1583 Provost from 1583; resigned)

=== Provosts of All Saints ===
- Jakob Geiger from Langenargen (1609–1635)
- Konrad Henny (1635–1647; died in Austria)
- Christoph Angerer (1649–1675)
- Georg Konrad from Rappertswil (1675–1682)
- Adam Schmid from Freiburg (1682–1698)
- Melchior Knoll from Türkheim in the Alsace (1698–1699)
- Dominik Simonis from Freiburg (1699–1713)

=== Abbots of St. Märgen ===
- Andreas Dilger from Bermatingen (1713–1736)
- Peter Glunk from Seppenhofen, today part of Löffingen (1736–1766)
- Michael Fritz of Horb am Neckar (1766–1797)
- Josef Kurz from Ellwangen (Jagst) (1797–1806; dissolution of the abbey)

== Literature ==
- Josef Bader: Die Schicksale der ehemaligen Abtei S. Märgen im breisgauischen Schwarzwalde. in: Freiburger Diözesan-Archiv, Vol. 2, Freiburg im Breisgau, 1866, pp. 211–278. (Digitalisat)
- Manfred Hermann: St. Märgen im Schwarzwald und seine Wallfahrtsgeschichte. Die Gnadenmutter der einstigen Klosterkirche und die Wallfahrt zum hl. Judas Thaddäus auf dem Ohmen. Kunstverlag Josef Fink, Lindenberg im Allgäu, 2002.
- Manfred Hermann: Katholische Pfarr- und Wallfahrtskirche Mariä Himmelfahrt St. Märgen im Schwarzwald. Kunstverlag Josef Fink, Lindenberg im Allgäu, 2003, ISBN 3-89870-135-2.
- Klaus Hog: Im Gedenken an die Säkularisation des Klosters Mariazell auf dem Schwarzwald. 1806–2006. St. Märgen, 2005.
- Elisabeth Irtenkauf: Die Tagebücher des Abtes bzw. Propstes Andreas Dilger von St. Märgen und Allerheiligen/Freiburg (reg. 1713–1736). In: Freiburger Diözesan-Archiv, Vol. 119 (1999), pp. 5–328 (digitalised)
- Elisabeth Irtenkauf, Wolfgang Irtenkauf: Die Tagebücher des Abtes bzw. Propstes Peter Glunk von St. Märgen auf dem Schwarzwald (reg. 1736–1766). In: Freiburger Diözesan-Archiv, Vol. 115 (1995), pp. 35–278 (digitalised)
- Elisabeth Irtenkauf, Klaus Hog: Die Baugeschichte des Klosters St. Märgen auf dem Schwarzwald eingebettet in die Klostergeschichte (ca. 1115–1860). Kunstverlag Josef Fink, Lindenberg im Allgäu, 2010, ISBN 978-3-89870-274-4.
- Franz Kern: Das Tagebuch des vorletzten Abtes von St. Märgen im Schwarzwald, Michael Fritz. In: Freiburger Diözesan-Archiv, Vol. 89 (1969), pp. 141–309 (digitalised)
- Bernhard Mangei: Herrschaftsbildung von Königtum, Kirche und Adel zwischen Oberrhein und Schwarzwald. Dissertation Freiburg 2003 (full text)
- Wolfgang Müller: Studien zur Geschichte der Klöster St. Märgen und Allerheiligen, Freiburg i. Br. In: Freiburger Diözesan-Archiv, Vol. 89 (1969), pp. 5–129 (digitalised)
- Johannes Weber: Aus der Geschichte der katholischen Pfarrgemeinde St. Märgen. 2. Auflage. Katholische Kirchengemeinde St. Märgen, 1985.
