= Sankt Märgen =

- Municipality
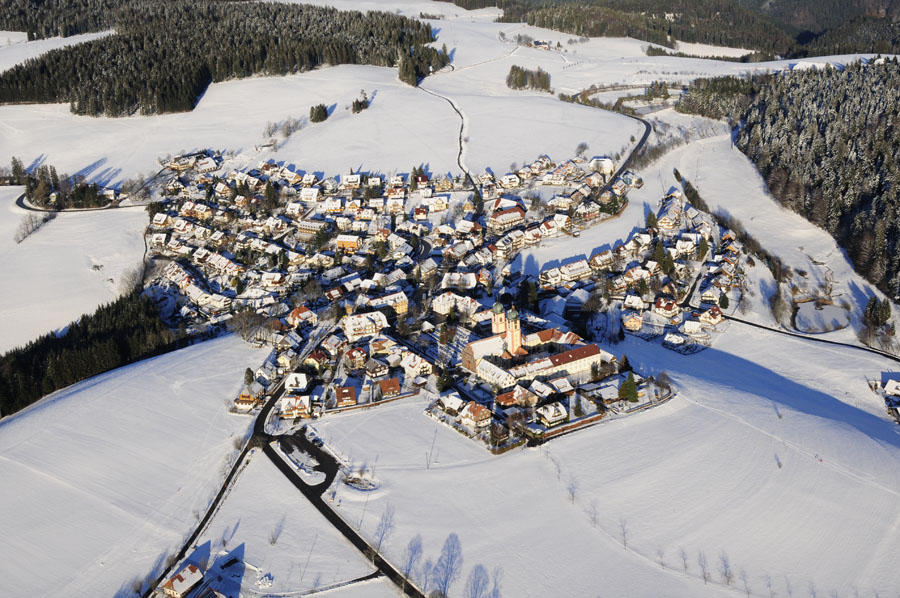
- Aerial view

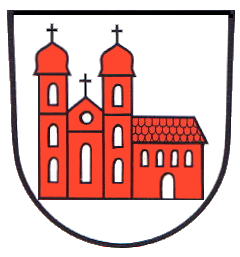
- Coat of arms

- Location of Sankt Märgen within Breisgau-Hochschwarzwald district
- Interactive map of Sankt Märgen
- Location within Germany Location within Baden-Württemberg
- Coordinates: 48°00′30″N 08°05′37″E
- Country: Germany
- State: Baden-Württemberg
- Admin. region: Freiburg
- District: Breisgau-Hochschwarzwald

Government
  - Mayor (2021–29): Manfred Kreutz

Area
  - Total: 33.37 km^{2} (12.88 sq mi)
- Elevation: 895 m (2,936 ft)

Population (2025-12-31)
  - Total: 1,958
  - Density: 58.68/km^{2} (152.0/sq mi)
- Time zone: UTC+01:00 (CET)
  - Summer (DST): UTC+02:00 (CEST)
- Postal codes: 79274
- Dialling codes: 07669
- Vehicle registration: FR
- Website: www.sankt-maergen.de

Sankt Märgen (Low Alemannic: Sankt Märge) is a German municipality in the middle of the Black Forest, which belongs to the district of Breisgau-Hochschwarzwald. The Kurort (spa town) is located around 25 km east of Freiburg im Breisgau.

== Geography ==
=== Geographical location ===
Sankt Märgen is located on a mountain spur. The village territory extends from the Thurner Plateau in the south to the eastern foothills of Kandel to the north, which are between 570 and 1132 meters high. To the east and west its boundaries are marked by deep valleys.

=== Municipal Arrangement ===
Around half the residents live in the village proper. The rest live across the surrounding countryside.

== History ==
Between 1115 and 1118 the Augustinian monastery of Maria-Zell auf dem Schwarzwald was established by Count Bruno von Haigerloch-Wiesneck, Chancellor of Henry V and Provost of Straßburg, as competition to the Zähringen-founded Benedictine monastery of St. Peter auf dem Schwarzwald. The town and the monastery were dependent upon each other for many years. In 1716 a two-steepled Baroque monastery church was built, and the life of the community underwent a revival, until 1806 when the monastery was given up.

== Politics ==
=== Mayors ===
- 1977-1993 Manfred Holzmann (CDU)
- 1993-today: Josef Waldvogel (CDU)

=== Sister cities ===
- Erdeven, southern Brittany, France, since 1997
