= Stegen =

- Municipality
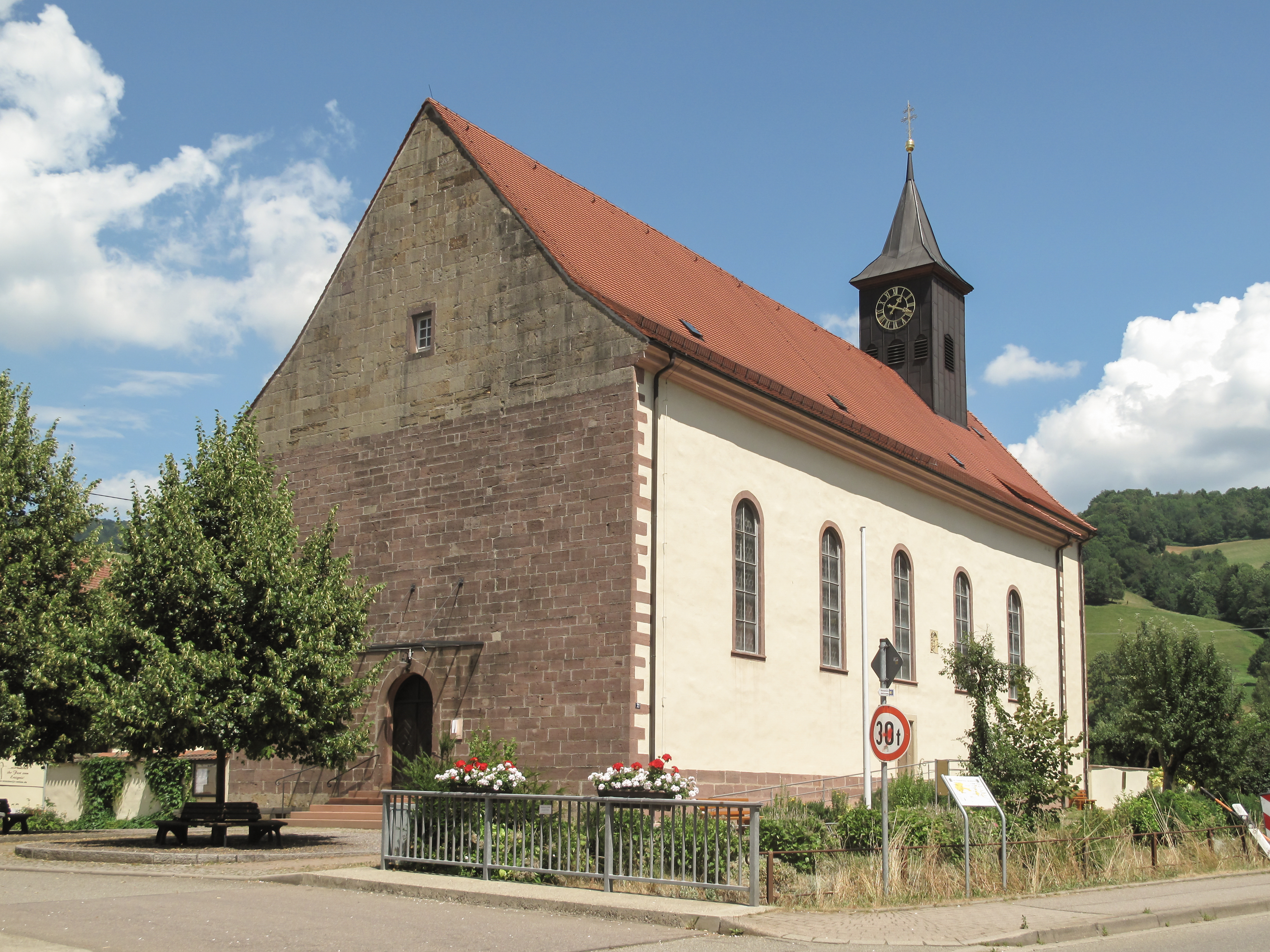
- Church of Saint James in Eschbach

- Coat of arms

- Location of Stegen within Breisgau-Hochschwarzwald district
- Interactive map of Stegen
- Location within Germany Location within Baden-Württemberg
- Coordinates: 47°58′58″N 7°57′50″E
- Country: Germany
- State: Baden-Württemberg
- Admin. region: Freiburg
- District: Breisgau-Hochschwarzwald
- Subdivisions: 3

Government
  - Mayor (2023–31): Fränzi Kleeb (CDU)

Area
  - Total: 26.32 km^{2} (10.16 sq mi)
- Elevation: 408 m (1,339 ft)

Population (2025-12-31)
  - Total: 4,490
  - Density: 171/km^{2} (442/sq mi)
- Time zone: UTC+01:00 (CET)
  - Summer (DST): UTC+02:00 (CEST)
- Postal codes: 79252
- Dialling codes: 07661
- Vehicle registration: FR
- Website: www.dreisamportal.de

Stegen (German pronunciation: [ˈʃteːɡn̩]) is a municipality in the Breisgau-Hochschwarzwald district, Baden-Württemberg, Germany. It borders on the city of Freiburg, being about 8 km away as the crow flies, lying in the valley of the river Dreisam. The municipality includes three population centres: the town of Stegen (which itself includes the villages of Weiler, Oberbirken, Unterbirken and Rechtenbach) and the villages of Eschbach and Wittental.

Economically, Stegen is partly an offshoot of Freiburg; for example, the Forest Zoology Institute of the University of Freiburg maintains a field station at Wittental. It also plays a role in Black Forest tourism, with guest houses and other facilities catering to visitors. It is the first town that a hiker on the Freiburg-Lake Constance Black Forest Trail passes through when travelling eastwards on the path from Freiburg.

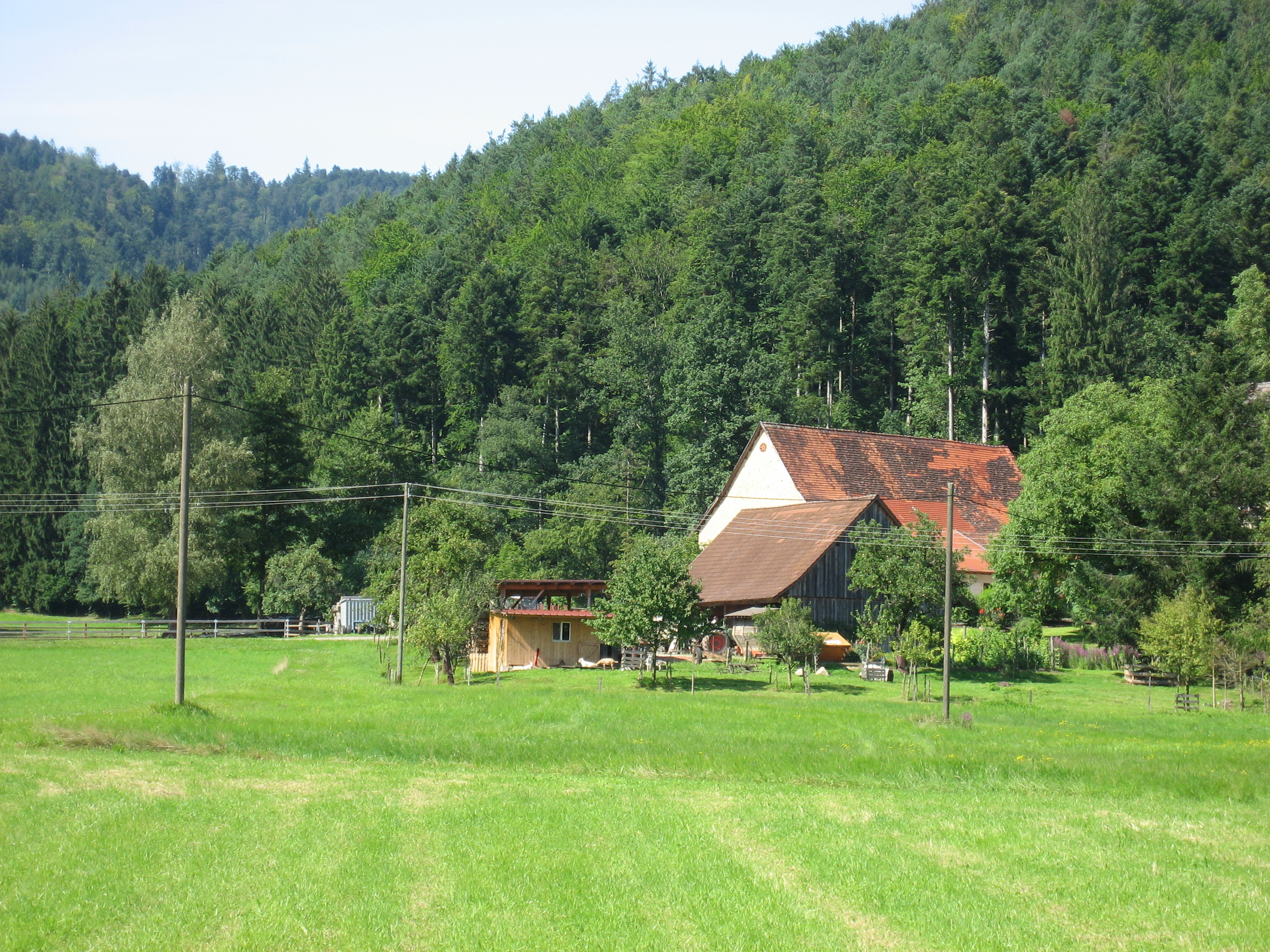
Meadows and woods at Wittental, part of the municipality of Stegen
