= Höllental (Black Forest) =

Valley in Baden-Württemberg, Germany

Coordinates: 47.935°N 08.0294°E

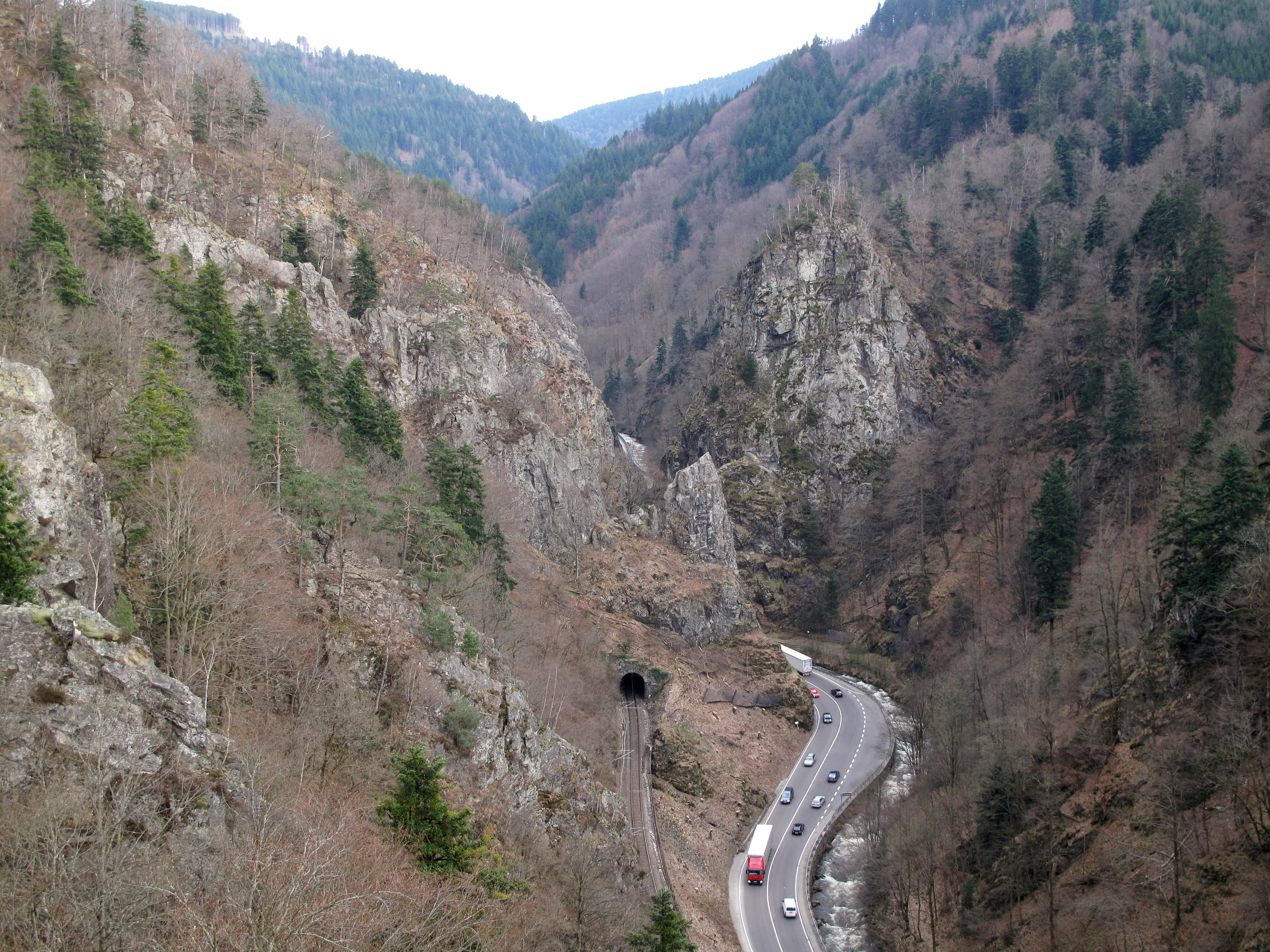
View from the ruins of Falkenstein Castle into the Höllental

The Höllental (German pronunciation: [ˈhœlənˌtaːl], lit. 'Hell's Valley') in the Black Forest is a deep valley - in places like a gorge - in the state of Baden-Württemberg in Germany. The valley, which is about 9 km long, is located in the southern part of the Southern Black Forest Nature Park about 18 km southeast of Freiburg im Breisgau between Hinterzarten and Buchenbach-Himmelreich. The Rotbach stream (also called Höllenbach in the upper Höllental) runs through the valley. "Hölle" is the German word for "hell". In the narrow, dark valley, travellers almost felt like moving underground. The valley was the locale of the Battle of Emmendingen in 1796, part of the French Revolutionary Wars.

== Formation ==
The Höllental is one of the valleys in the Black Forest that cuts through the asymmetric ridgeline of mountains from its plateau-like eastern uplands and runs down its steep western escarpment. The valley follows the line of the Bonndorf Rift Valley (Bonndorfer Graben), which runs from Kaiserstuhl via the Wutach gorge and Hegau to Lake Constance and is part of this tectonically formed fault. Additionally, it could have been created as a result of repeated glaciation of the Black Forest's uplands by ice lakes that could have spilled westwards over the eroded ridgeline. As a result, the tributaries of the Höllenbach east of the ridgeline flow initially southeast, turning almost 180° towards the northeast into the Höllental itself, a situation similar to that of the Maloja Pass in Engadin.

== Course – "Hell" and "Heaven" ==
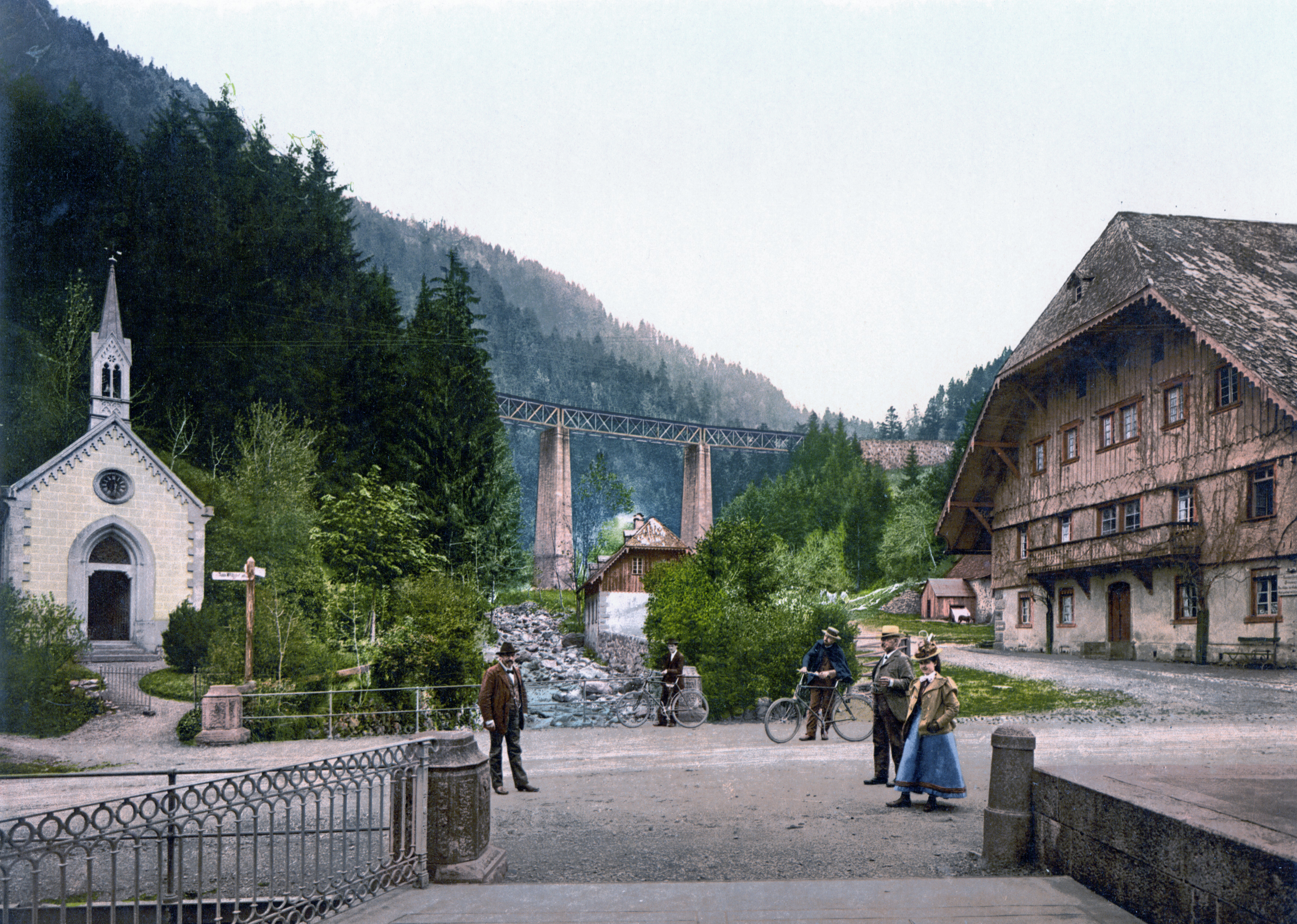
Höllsteig and the Ravenna bridge around 1900

Below the high-lying hollows of Hinterzarten, the federal highway B 31 winds downhill, partly in spectacular loops, at the head of the former glacial valley. In this enclosed bowl with the hamlet of Höllsteig ("Hell Path"), the so-called Löffeltal ("Valley of Spoons"), where beginning in the 18th century metal spoons were forged, joins the Zartenbach stream south of the road. To the north, the Ravenna gorge, with its numerous waterfalls, opens up under the Ravenna viaduct of the Höllental Railway. From the south the Bistenbach and Alpersbach streams tumble into it, becoming waterfalls. After the station of Hirschsprung and following the U-shaped valley with steep slopes up to 600 m high (and its four-lane road) is a section with towering cliffs up to 130 m and known as the Höllenpass ("Hell Narrows"). The narrowest part of the gorge is called the Hirschsprung ("Deer's Jump") and was originally only 9 m wide. Thus, a common tale is existing about a red deer's jump across it. Behind the rocks with the ruins of Falkenstein Castle, the valley broadens out somewhat and provides more space for the houses and farms of Falkensteig. At Himmelreich ("Heaven") hamlet and its railway station, the valley abruptly opens up into the Basin of Zarten.

== Importance for transportation ==
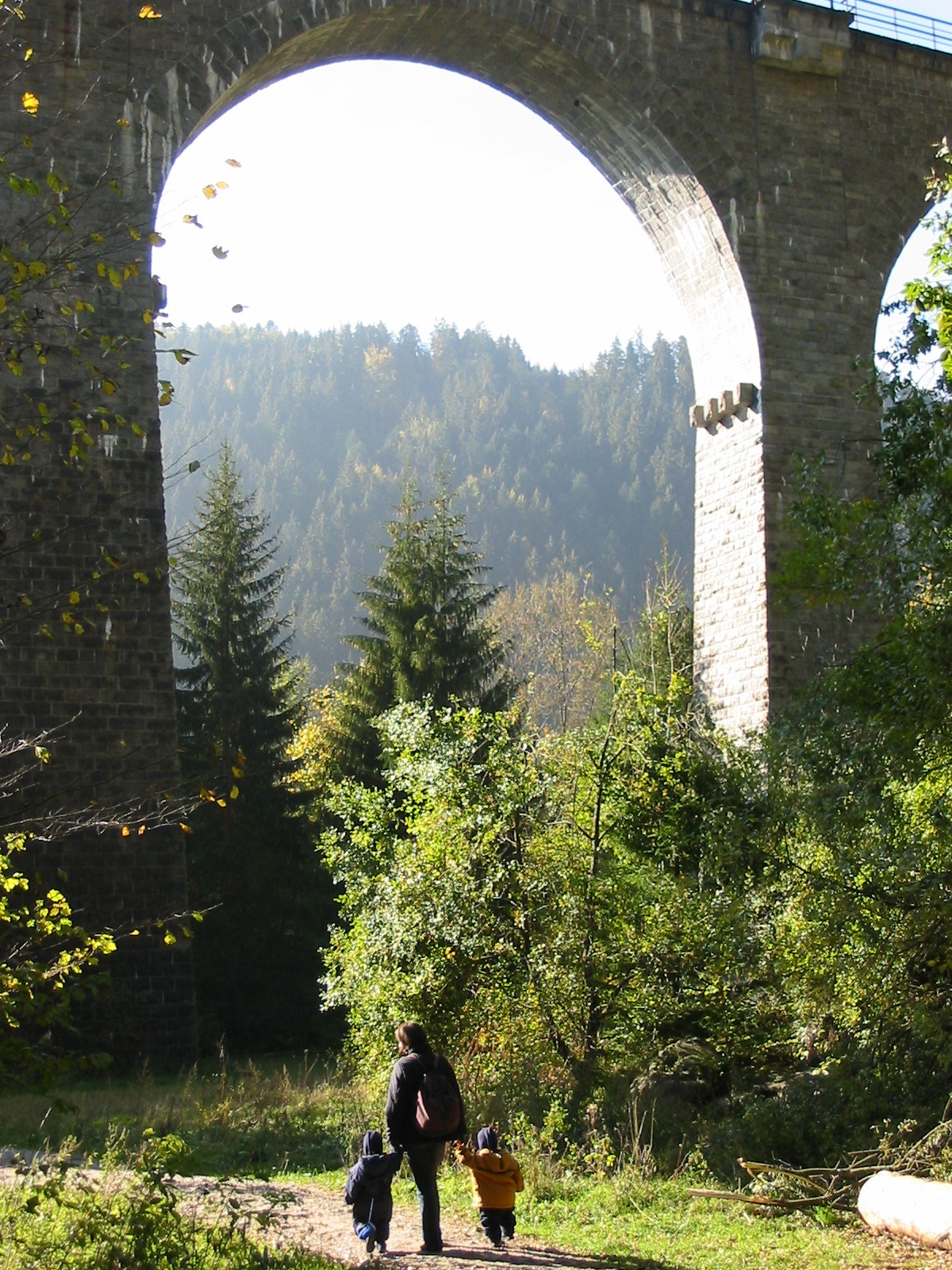
Viaduct over the Ravenna gorge

The great importance of the Höllental today for long-distance traffic crossing the relatively low-lying Hinterzarten saddle (about 910 m) was only achieved at significant cost. Initially, the cart track through the Wagensteige ("Wagon Ascent") valley to the north was more important. But by the 12th century, another track, the Falkensteige ("Hawk Ascent"), had been built by the dukes of Zähringen from Freiburg im Breisgau to Donaueschingen, through what was then called the Falkenstein ("hawk stone") Valley (Falkensteiner Tal), the present-day Höllental. The track was guarded at the exit to the narrow pass by the Falkenstein Castle ("Hawk Rock Castle"), but was later threatened, nevertheless. Not until the coach and the large bridle train of Marie Antoinette, which was to bring her to her future husband, the future Louis XVI, had to traverse the route, was the track developed into a road. The Falkenstein Valley achieved fame again during the retreat of French troops under General Moreau in 1796, at the Battle of Emmendingen, and was referred to as the Val d'enfer ("Hell Valley"). As early as 1691, Emperor Leopold I had described the present-day Hirschsprung as die Höll ("hell", formerly also "hollow"), when he reviewed the defence of routes through the Black Forest. Even the name of the Ravenna ravine had French or other Romanic origins; it is related la ravine. The term arose considerably earlier because it was already in use by 1560. During subsequent work on the route, the gorge at Hirschsprung was successively blasted open. The level of traffic on the present-day B 31 has resulted in plans to replace the main road through Falkensteig, the gorge, and the bends at Höllsteig by tunnels.

Since 1887, the Höllentalbahn (Hell Valley Railway) has passed up the gorge, initially using a rack railway system. The incline is 1:18 and it climbs a total of 441 m.

The walking trail along the bottom of the ravine, known as the Jägerpfad ("hunter's path"), once belonged to the Freiburg-Lake Constance Black Forest trail (Schwarzwald-Querweg Freiburg-Bodensee), but this has been currently diverted over the northern side of the valley due to the weight of road traffic.

== Hell Valley Wind ==
A regional wind, which constantly supplies the town centre of Freiburg with fresh air, is named after the Höllental, although in fact only part of the wind blowing through Freiburg comes from the Hell Valley. The foehn wind from the valley combines with streams of cold air from the other side valleys of the Zarten Basin and blows through the narrow pass at Ebnet, accelerating at the exit of the basin into the Freiburg area of the Upper Rhine Plain (Oberrheinische Tiefebene).

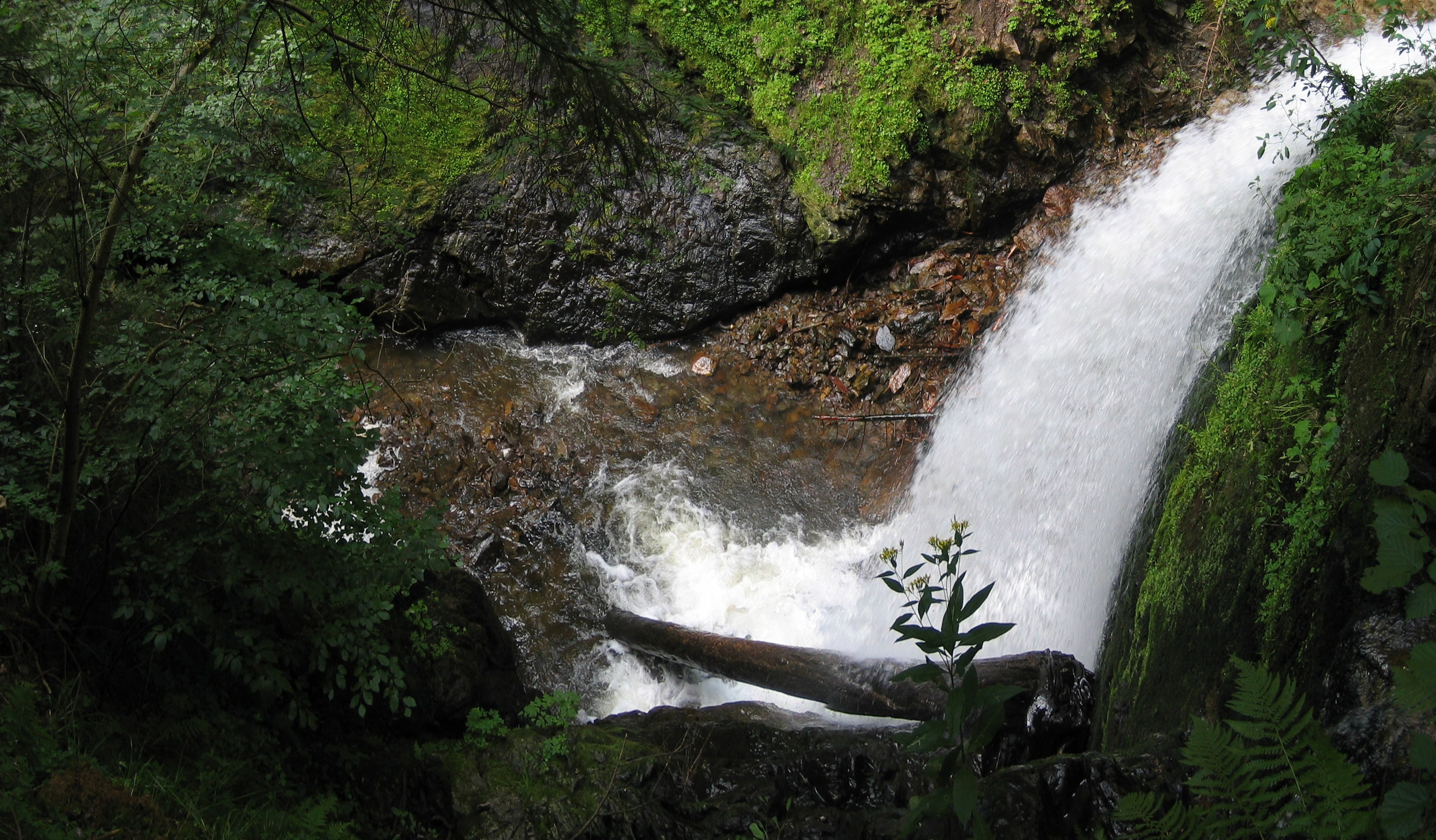
Large waterfall in the Ravenna gorge

== Places of interest ==
- Hirschsprung gorge with a deer monument (Hirschsprung saga)
- St. Oswald Chapel in Steig with a late-Gothic altar
- Ravenna gorge with its viaduct and waterfalls (height: 16 m und 4 m)
- Bisten waterfall (height: 50 m)
- Ruins of Falkenstein Castle
- Himmelreich
