= Rotbach (Dreisam) =

River in Germany

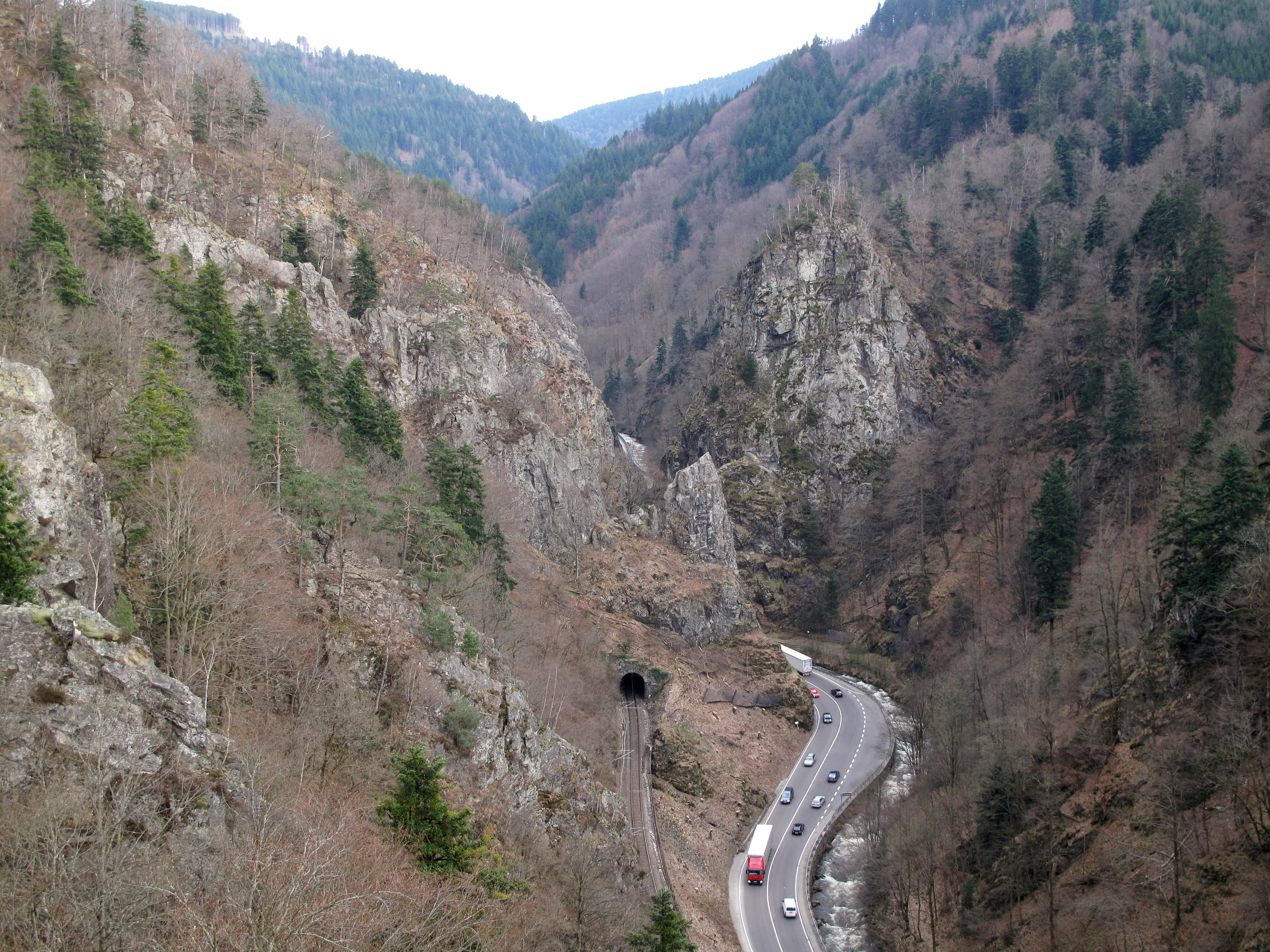
- The Rotbach in the Höllental valley, where it is also known as the Höllenbach

Location
- Country: Germany
- State: Baden-Württemberg
- Reference no.: DE: 23388

Physical characteristics
- Source
  - location: Near Hinterzarten-Oberzarten above the Mathisleweiher
  - coordinates: 47°53′07″N 8°05′07″E
  - elevation: ca. 1,085 m above sea level (NN)
- Mouth
  - location: Confluence of the Rotbach and Wagensteigbach to form the Dreisam near Kirchzarten
  - coordinates: 47°58′27″N 7°57′38″E
  - elevation: ca. 377 m above sea level (NN)
- Length: 19.9 km
- Basin size: 48.6 km²

Basin features
- Progression: Dreisam→ Elz→ Rhine→ North Sea
- Landmarks: Villages: Hinterzarten, Buchenbach und Kirchzarten
- Waterbodies: Reservoirs: Mathisleweiher

The Rotbach (in its upper reaches it is called the Zartenbach and Löffeltalbach, in its middle section, the Höllenbach) is the 19.9-kilometre-long, left-hand and southeasterly headstream of the Dreisam in the Southern Black Forest in the south German state of Baden-Württemberg.

== Zartenbach ==
The headstreams of the upper reaches of the Rotbach, known as the Zartenbach, begin on the territory of Hinterzarten (Southern Black Forest Nature Park) southwest of the village of Oberzarten on the eastern mountainside of the Ramselehöhe (1,111,9 m) at about 1,085 metres above sea level. They gather on the bottom of a valley basin with a stepped longitudinal profile that was formed by an ice age glacier. On one of the levels the stream is impounded to form the pond of Mathisleweiher (999 m above sea level (NN)). Thereafter it flows in a broad left-hand arc around the Windeck (1,209 m) and passes through Oberzarten and Hinterzarten northwards in the broad hollow of the level Hinterzarten Moor (nature reserve).

== Löffeltalbach ==
After picking up the outflow of the western part of the moor, the stream deepens as it enters a V-shaped valley and descends steeply. The valley is named after the old workshops here that used to make wooden spoons (Holzlöffeln). Through this valley used to run the Löffeltalsteige, the ascent from the Höllental valley to the heights of Hinterzarten.

== Höllenbach ==
In the Höllental the Löffeltalbach merges with the Ravennabach coming from Ravenna Gorge to the northeast. The stream, now called the Höllenbach, flows northwest initially through the straight trough valley of the upper Höllental which was formed by ice age glaciers. It then comes to a gorge-like section of the valley which is known as the Hirschsprung or Höllenpass. The stream is accompanied by the B 31 and Höllentalbahn as it continues through the Höllental.

== Rotbach ==
In the lower section of the valley, the stream continues as the Rotbach through Falkensteig and Himmelreich (villages in the municipality of Buchenbach), where it flows out into the plain of the Zarten Basin. North of Kirchzarten the Rotbach empties into the Dreisam together with the Wagensteigbach above the bridge carrying Landesstraße 127 at a height of 377 m above NN.

== Sights ==
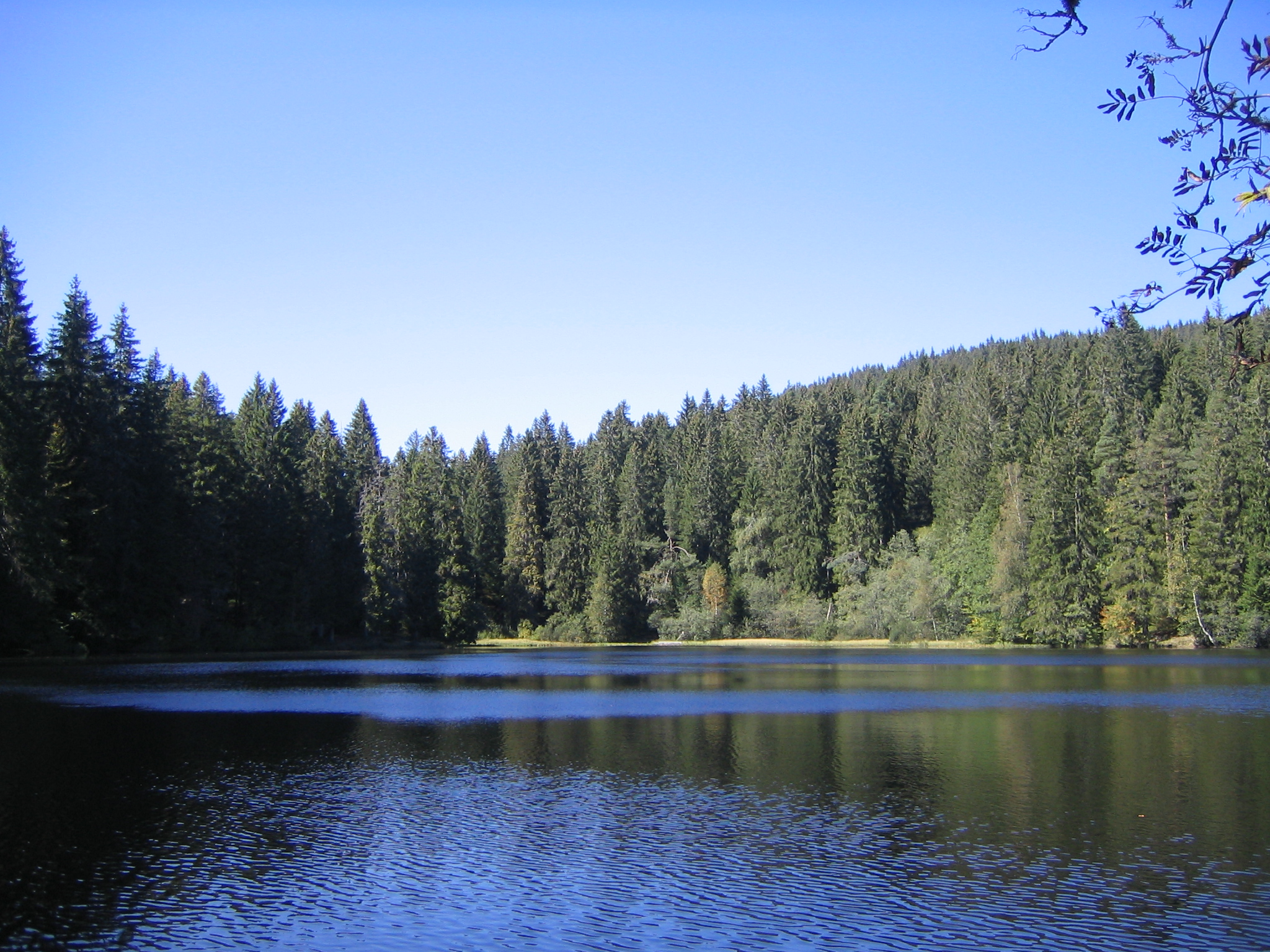
The Mathisleweiher in the source region of the Rotbach (Zartenbach)

The sights along the Rotbach include the:

- Mathisleweiher (also called the Mathislesweiher or Mathiesleweiher; source pond of the Zartenbach and Rotbachs)
- Höllental (narrow valley of the Höllenbach/Rotbach)
- Ravenna Gorge and Ravennabach (side valley of the Höllental)
- Tarodunum (ca. 200 ha large Celtic oppidum; east of Kirchzarten)

== See also ==
- List of rivers of Baden-Württemberg
