= Wagensteigbach =

River in Germany

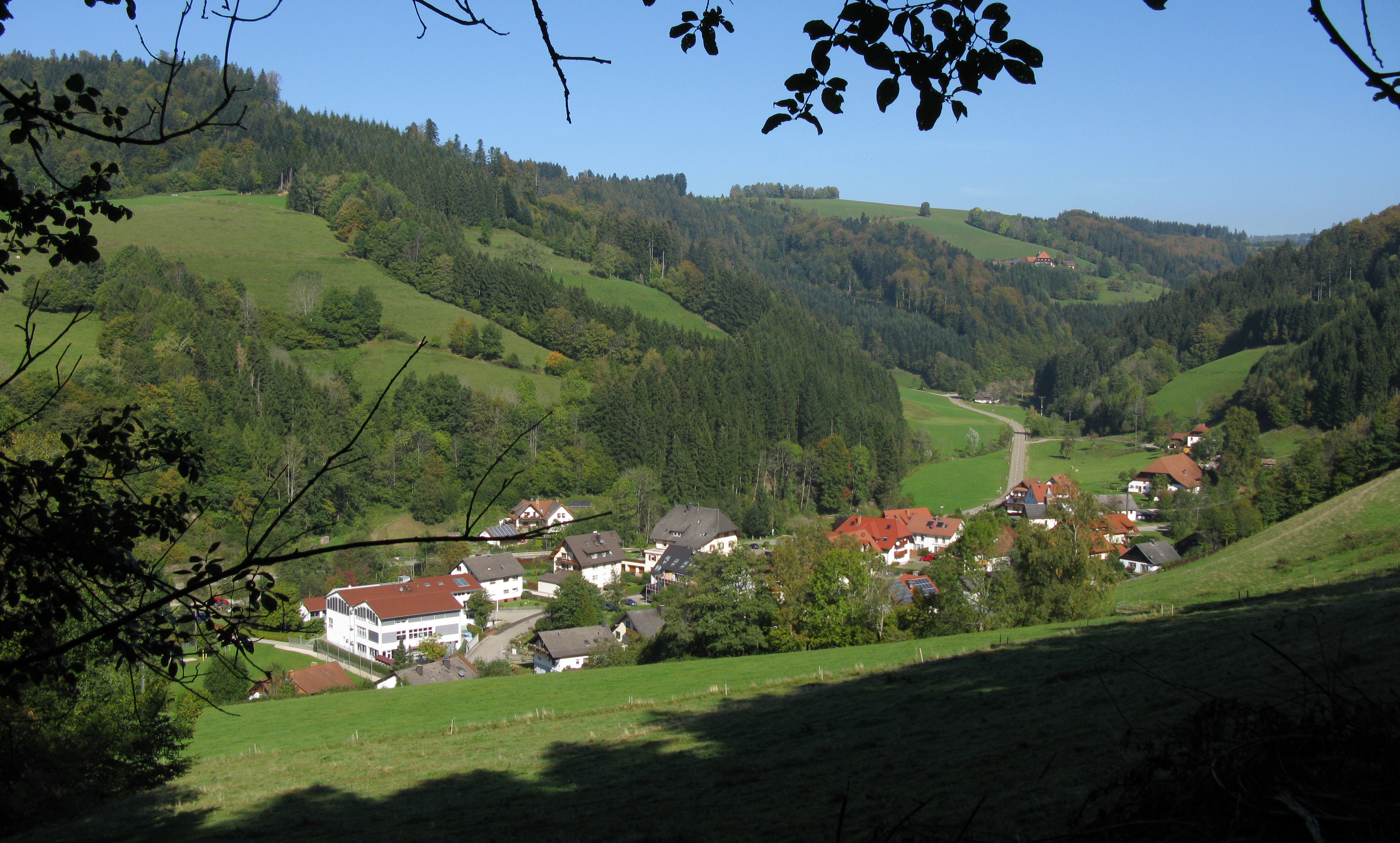
- The middle part of the valley

Location
- Country: Germany
- State: Baden-Württemberg

Physical characteristics
- Mouth
  - location: Confluence with the Rotbach to form the Dreisam near Kirchzarten
  - coordinates: 47°58′27″N 7°57′38″E
- Length: 17.5 km (10.9 mi)

Basin features
- Progression: Dreisam→ Elz→ Rhine→ North Sea

Wagensteigbach is a river of Baden-Württemberg, Germany. At its confluence with the Rotbach near Kirchzarten, the Dreisam is formed.

== See also ==
- List of rivers of Baden-Württemberg
