= Kirchzarten Airfield =

Kirchzarten Airfield Segelfluggelände Kirchzarten-Oberried
- IATA: none; ICAO: none

Summary
- Airport type: Private
- Operator: BVS Breisgauverein für Segelflug
- Serves: Freiburg
- Location: Kirchzarten, Germany
- Elevation AMSL: 1,325 ft / 405 m
- Coordinates: 47°57′04″N 007°57′20″E

Map

Runways
Direction	Length		Surface
Direction	m	ft	Surface
18C/36C	1,170	3,840	Grass
18R/36L	260	850	Grass
18L/36R	410	1,350	Grass

Statistics (2010)
- Launches: 2,080
- Source: BVS Breisgauverein für Segelflug

Kirchzarten Airfield (in German Segelfluggelände Kirchzarten-Oberried) is an unpaved airfield located approximately 10 km (6.2 mi) southeast of Freiburg im Breisgau, Germany, in the town of Kirchzarten.
The airfield is home to Freiburg and Kirchzarten based gliding club Breisgauverein für Segelflug (BVS), which has also constructed the airfield and the facilities in the 70s. Until 2009, two other gliding clubs shared the airfield with the BVS, AKA Flieg Freiburg and CFM Emmendingen. They have both moved their operations to Freiburg Airport since.

== Operations ==
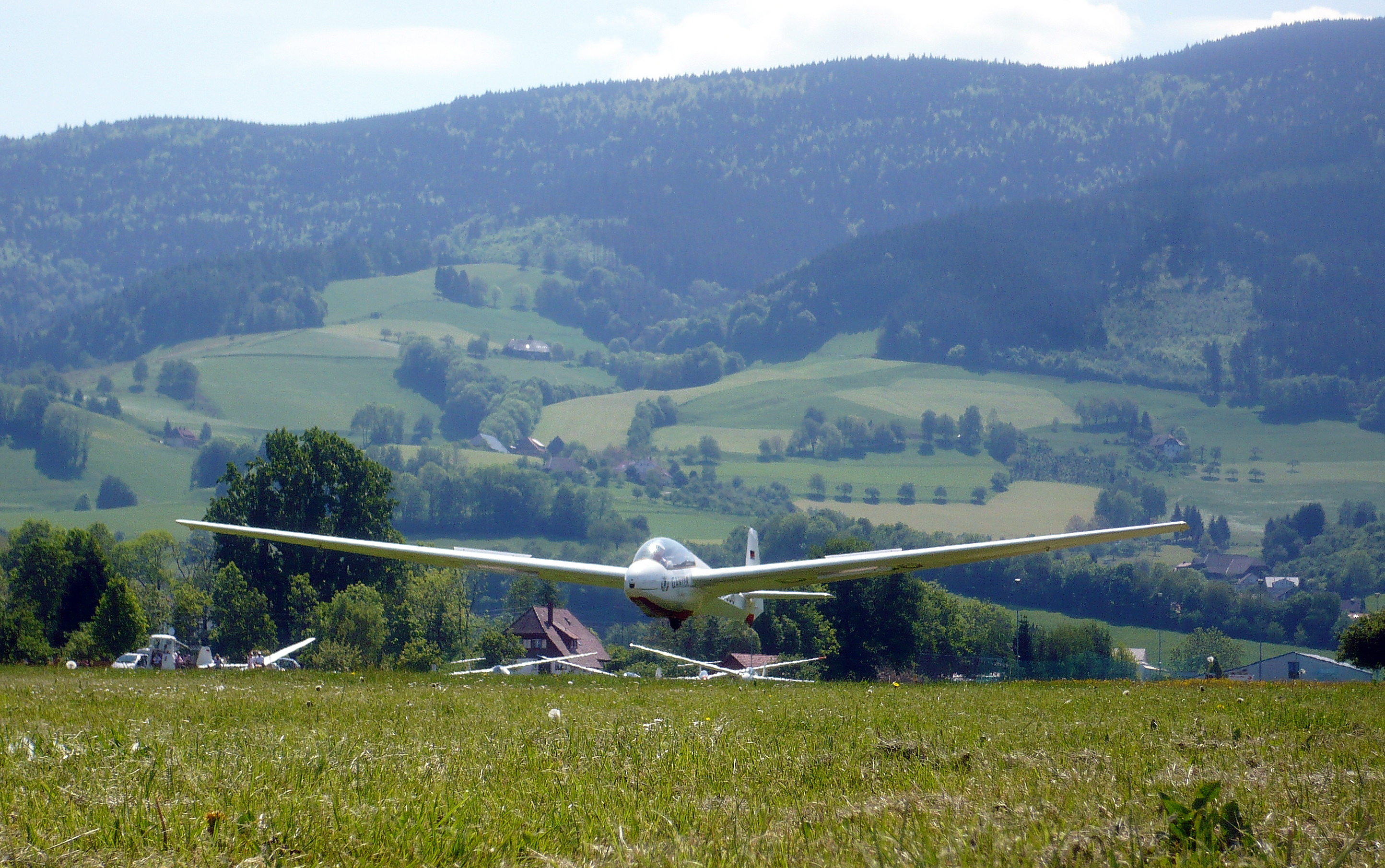
Glider ASK 13 on short final runway 36L

Currently, only winch launching for gliders is permitted at Kirchzarten. Motorized take-offs are forbidden due to local noise restrictions. There have been occasional exceptions to this rule during special events.

Runway 18C / 36C (1170m) is used for winch launches, in most cases 36C due to wind conditions. Landings are usually done on the two shorter landing fields, but in calm wind conditions and with little traffic the center runway is used in the opposite direction to reduce turnaround times.

== Facilities ==
Up to this day Kirchzarten Airfield consists of a Hangar of the Breisgauverein für Segelflug, three runways, one launching winch, a clubhouse as well as a nearby located camping site.

== Tower ==
For flight operations, qualified club members take over the duty of aviation authority. With weather in VMC, Kirchzarten Airfield is approximately operated from 10AM to 18PM local time. Kirchzarten Segelflug ist available on Frequency 122.475 MHz.

== Winch ==
The fields launching winch is a 200 hp strong double drum winch. It is capable of launching two take-offs within a few minutes, allowing up to 50 launches per day, requiring an economic ground operation management. In daily operation, the two cables are designated as "Bachseil" and "Straßenseil", related to either the creek at the Eastern border of the field or the Street "Oberrieder Straße/L126" located at the Western border of the field.

== Aviation clubs ==
One club is the operator of the field. The Breisgauverein für Segelflug was founded in 1962 and is in possession of a hangar, a clubhouse and some glider planes which are used for flight education.
