= Mathisleweiher =

Bog lake in Germany

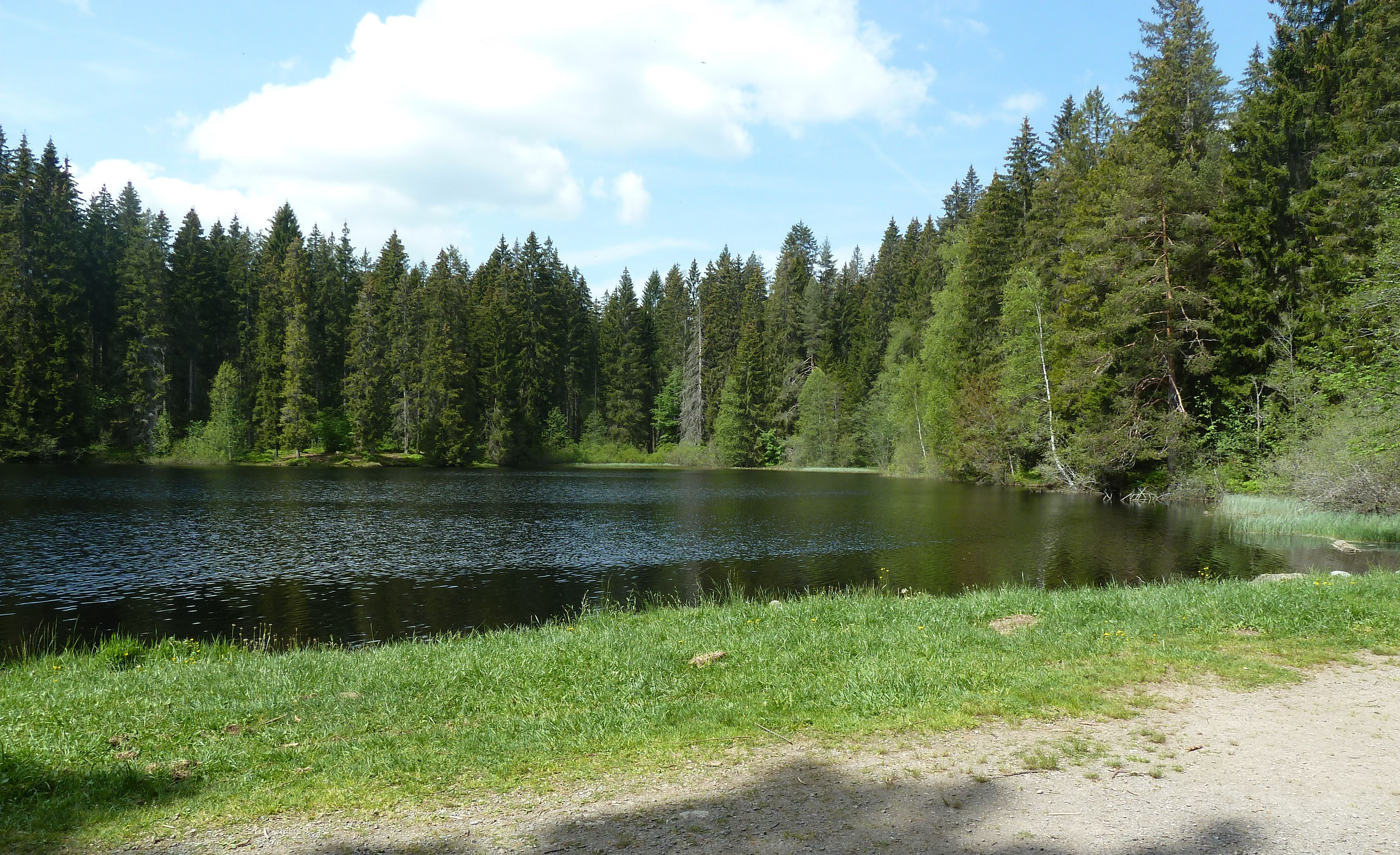
- The Mathisleweiher in the Eschengrundmoos Nature Reserve

- Location within Germany
- Location: High Black Forest Baden-Württemberg Breisgau-Hochschwarzwald Municipality of Hinterzarten
- Coordinates: 47°53′06″N 8°05′05″E
- Primary inflows: Zartenbach
- Primary outflows: Zartenbach → Rotbach → Dreisam → Elz → Rhine → North Sea
- Max. length: 0.14 km (0.087 mi) (Note: Length and width measured on the background layer Topographische Karte.)
- Max. width: 0.200 km (0.124 mi)
- Surface area: 0.018 km^{2} (0.0069 sq mi)^{2} (Note: Lake area from the layer: Stehende Gewässer.)
- Surface elevation: 999 m (3,278 ft) (Note: Height based on black writing on the background layer Topographische Karte.)

The Mathisleweiher is a large bog lake, under 2 hectares in area, in the Black Forest in southern Germany. It lies in the High Black Forest between Feldberg in the west and the Titisee in the east on the territory of Hinterzarten at about 999 m above NN southwest of the village in the Eschengrundmoos Nature Reserve. The pond impounds the Zartenbach which flows through it from west-southwest to east-northeast. The stream rises on the eastern slopes of the Ramselehöhe (1,112 m above NN) at about 1,055 m above NN, (Note: Height based on the contour image on the background layer Topographische Karte.) picks up the Eschengrundmoosbach from the right from the protected bog and runs for less than a kilometre before entering the lake. A shorter stream runs from the north from the woods of the Stuckwald. It has a catchment of 1.0 km^{2} (Note: Catchment measured from the background layer Topographische Karte.)

The lake is accessible from Hinterzarten but only on foot. A path runs from the village passing close to the lake and a spur branches off to the east shore.

Together with the Mathislehof, Mathislemühle and Mathislewald the pond belongs to the Müller-Fahnenberg Foundation of the University of Freiburg.

== Origin of the name ==
The Mathisleweiher s named after the nearby farm of Mathislehof, which in turn is named after the farmer, Mathias Rombach, who inherited the farm in 1736 by marrying the widow.
