= Ravenna Bridge =

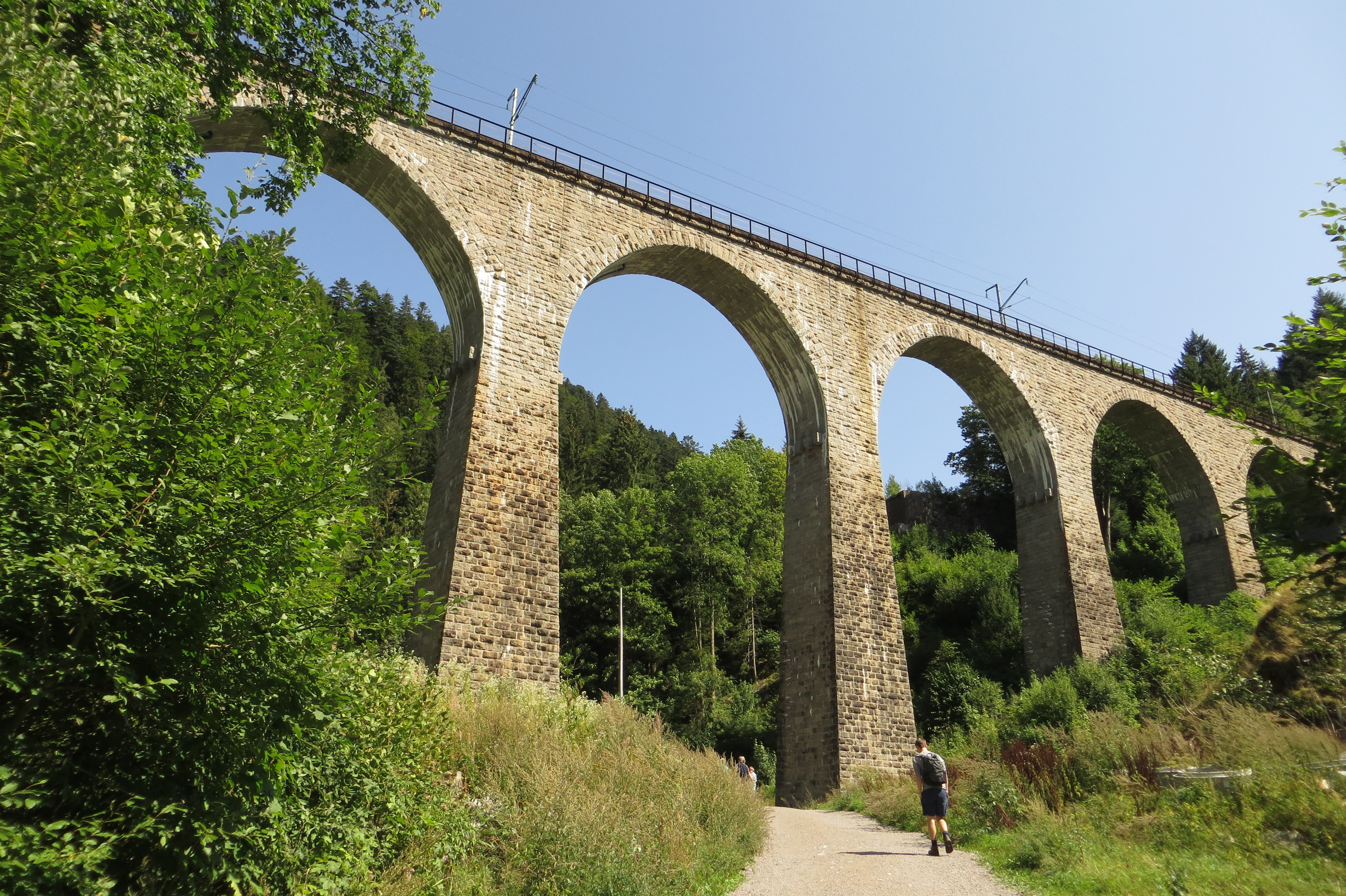
- The Ravenna Bridge
- Coordinates: 47°55′03″N 08°04′27″E
- Carries: Höllentalbahn railway line
- Crosses: Ravenna Gorge
- Locale: Breitnau, Breisgau-Hochschwarzwald, Baden-Württemberg, Germany
- Official name: Ravennabrücke

Characteristics
- Design: Arch viaduct
- Material: Stone, mortar
- Total length: 225 m (738 ft)
- Height: 58 m (190 ft)
- No. of spans: 9

History
- Construction start: 1926
- Construction end: 1927

Location
- Interactive map of Ravenna Bridge

The Ravenna Bridge is a 58-metre (190 ft) high and 225-metre (738 ft) long railway viaduct on the Höllental Railway line in the Black Forest, in Breitnau, Breisgau-Hochschwarzwald, Baden-Württemberg, Germany. The bridge crosses the Ravenna Gorge that ends in the upper Höllental valley, and has a grade of 12 metres (39 ft). The origin of the name most likely comes from the French ravin for gorge.

== History and construction ==
The first structure was completed in 1885 and consisted of a steel cantilever span that rested on three mortared sandstone block pillars. The bridge had a slight curve, and trains were limited to a speed of 15 kilometres per hour (9 mph) and an axle load of 16 tonnes (16 long tons). Heavier locomotives and faster speeds led to the construction in 1926–27 of the current structure, a mortared stone viaduct with nine arches and an arch span of 20 metres (66 ft), which also had the effect of straightening the railway line. The old bridge was then demolished, although the old abutments are still visible.

The Ravenna Tunnel that follows immediately after the bridge was originally 85 metres (279 ft) long. It was partially cut open and thus has a length today of only 47 metres (154 ft).

The bridge was exploded by German forces near the end of the World War II. It was re-built in 1947–48, under the direction of French occupying forces and with the use of German prisoners of war obligated to undertake compulsory labour, so that large quantities of logs from the Black Forest that had to be delivered as war reparations could be transported out.

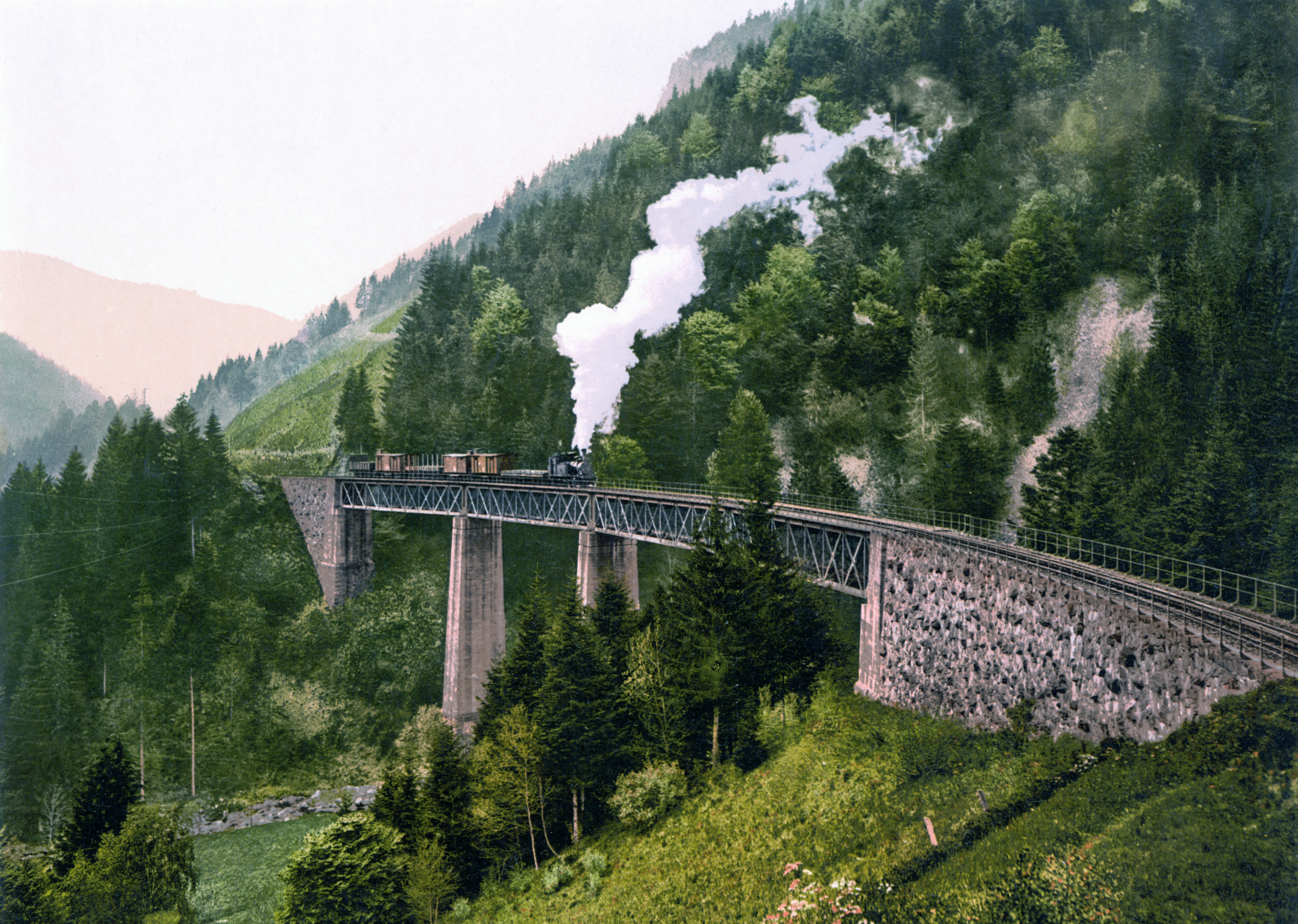
First Ravenna Bridge in 1900

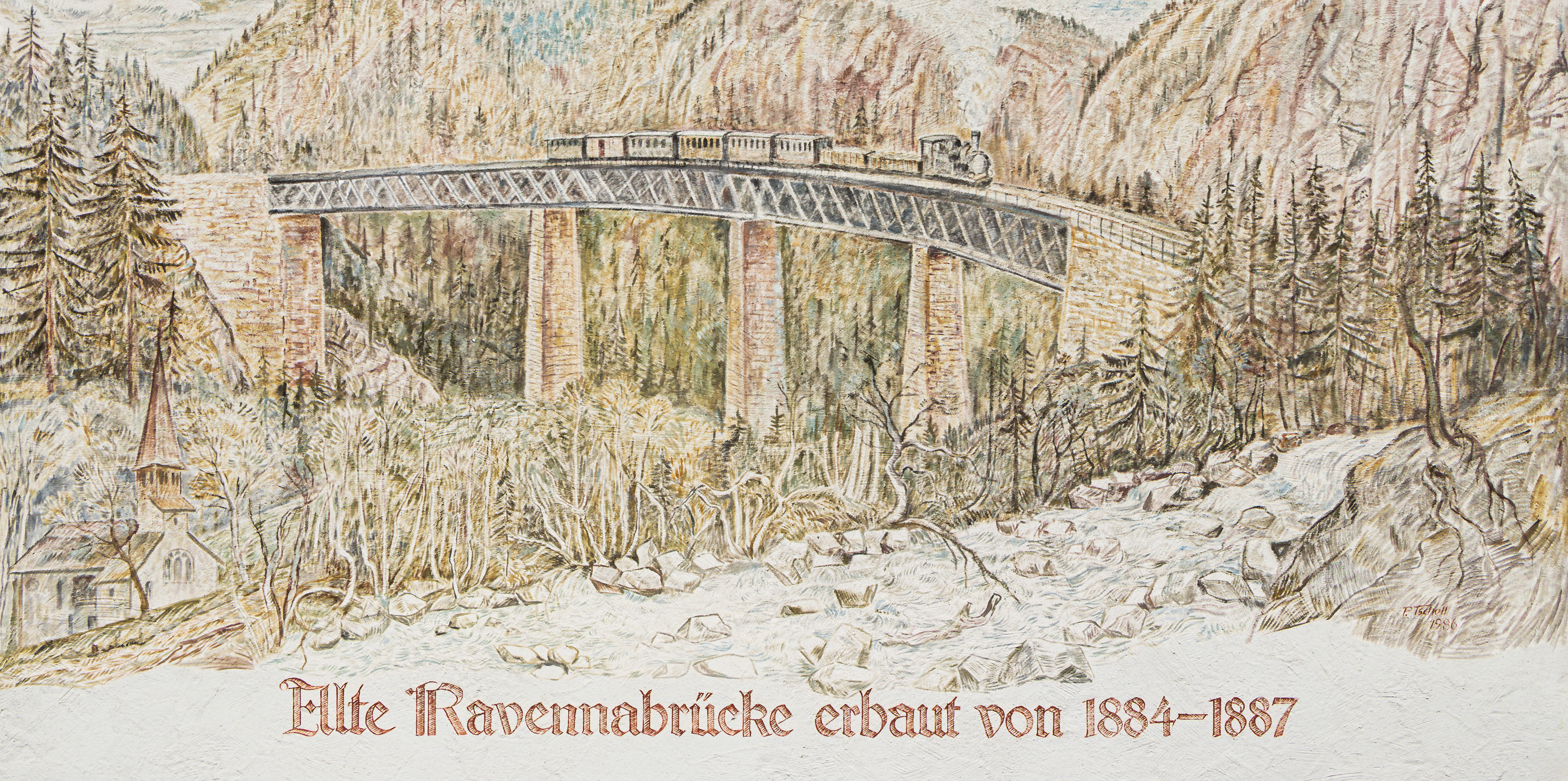
Mural at Hofgut Sternen
