= Höllentalbahn (Black Forest) =

Railway line in Germany

Coordinates: 47°54′09″N 8°09′31″E

Höllentalbahn Hell Valley Railway
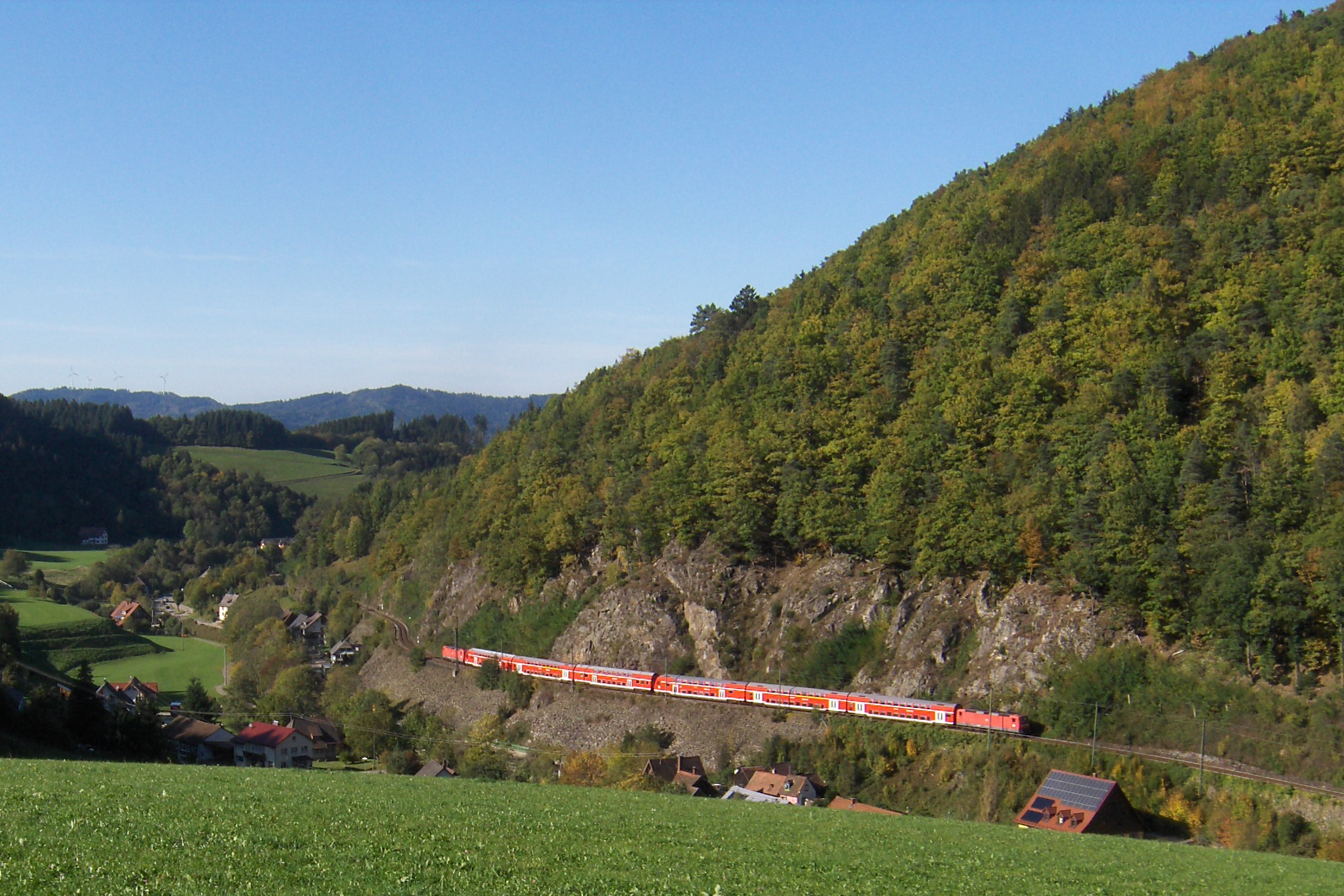

Overview
- Owner: Deutsche Bahn
- Line number: 4300
- Termini: Freiburg Hbf.; Donaueschingen station

Service
- Route number: 727

History
- Opened: 21 May 1887

Technical
- Line length: 74.7 km (46.4 mi)
- Number of tracks: single track
- Rack system: 1887 until 1933; now adhesion
- Track gauge: 1,435 mm (4 ft 8 1/2 in)
- Electrification: 1936 until 1960: 20 kV 50 Hz AC since 1960: 15 kV 16.7 Hz AC
- Operating speed: 100 km/h (62.1 mph)
- Highest elevation: 607 m (1,991 ft)
- Maximum incline: 5.5%
Route map
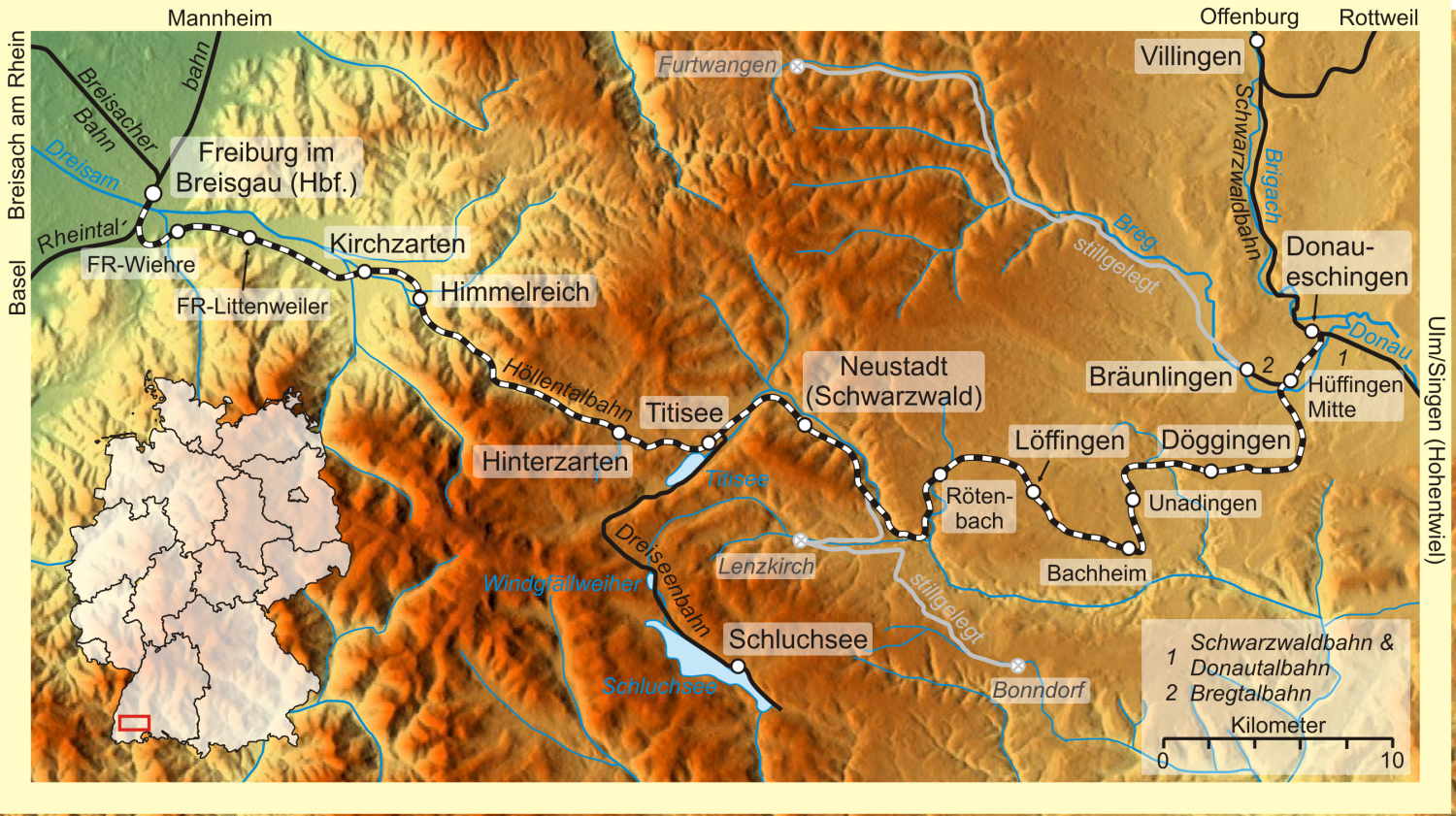
- Source: German railway atlas

The Höllentalbahn (literally, "Hell Valley Railway") is a railway line that partially runs through the Höllental valley in the Black Forest of Germany. The line connects Freiburg im Breisgau with Donaueschingen, a distance of 74.7 km (46.4 mi).

Over its entire course the line rises from an altitude of 278 m (912 ft) in Freiburg to 885 m (2,904 ft) in Hinterzarten. Part of the route has a 5.5% gradient, making the line one of the steepest in Germany.

The section Freiburg-Neustadt is electrified since 18 June 1936. Because of this and the steady decrease of traffic between Neustadt and Donaueschingen the route did not represent an operational unit anymore. The last direct connection between Freiburg and Donaueschingen ended in 2003 with the Kleber-Express Freiburg-Munich being discontinued. The missing section was electrified until the end of 2019 in the course of the project “Breisgau-S-Bahn 2020”, in order to enable direct trains from Breisach via Freiburg, Neustadt and Donaueschingen to Villingen.

== History ==
The line, which opened as far as Neustadt in 1887, was constructed for the Grand Duchy of Baden State Railway and was the last project of railway architect Robert Gerwig. The 7.2 km (4.5 mi) section of the line between Hirschsprung and Hinterzarten has a maximum gradient of 5.5%, and was initially operated as a rack railway on the Riggenbach system.

The line was extended from Neustadt to Donaueschingen in 1901. In 1932/33, ten powerful Class 85 steam locomotives were built, which enabled traffic to operate over the Hirschsprung and Hinterzarten section without rack assistance, and rack operation ceased in 1933.

In 1934, a new and partially tunnelled route within the city of Freiburg was opened. This enabled the original route, which passed closer to the city centre and over congested level crossings, to be closed.

In 1936, the Deutsche Reichsbahn electrified the line between Freiburg and Neustadt, installing a 20 kV, 50 Hz AC. This led to the subsequent adoption of the 25 kV AC 50 Hz system in France and elsewhere. Post-WWII, France occupied the south-west of Germany and the Höllentalbahn. Since the electrification of Mannheim–Karlsruhe–Basel railway had been completed in 1958, the Höllentalbahn was linked to the nationwide electric railway system. Therefore, in 1960, the electrified section of the Höllentalbahn was converted to the standard 15 kV, 16 2/3 Hz system used throughout the German railway network.

The Höllentalbahn was used successfully to test designs for the DB Class 144. Later, electric motive power was supplied by the Series 145, which was itself replaced by the DB Class 139. 1996–2019, the electric line used modern double-decker rolling stock pulled by DB Class 143 locomotives. Exceptions were the two long distance Trains that brought their regular locomotives to the Höllentalbahn: Regional-Express Kleber-Express Freiburg-Munich did no longer change its locomotive in Neustadt 1988-2003 as last remaining direct train between Freiburg and Donaueschingen thus the diesel DB Class 218 operated also on the electrified part of the route on this train. The InterRegio Höllental Emden-Seebrugg ran with its DB Class 101 1996–2002. On the stretch of line between Neustadt and Donaueschingen DB Class 215 operated the trains until they were replaced by DB Class 628 in 1988 ending direct connections over Neustadt. From the 2000s onward DB Class 611 took over until this part of the Höllentalbahn got electrified in 2019. Since then Alstom Coradia Units (DB Class 1440) operate the S1 Breisach-Seebrugg and S10 Freiburg-Villingen lines.

== Development during the era of the German National Railway (1919–1945) ==
On 14 December 1927 the old Ravenna bridge that crossed the Ravennaschlucht (Ravenna ravine), close to Hinterzarten, was replaced with a new viaduct, because it could not cope with the demand anymore. With the construction of the new viaduct, the railway section of the Höllentalbahn was straightened in that area. The costs were about 1.7 million ℛ︁ℳ︁, and only the abutments are still leftovers of the old bridge. The Ravenna tunnel which follows immediately after the bridge was originally 85 metres long. It was partially split open so that nowadays it only has a length of 47 metres.

At the beginning of the 1930s, the Höllentalbahn between Freiburg main station and Freiburg- Littenweiler was relocated, so that the station of Freiburg-Wiehre had to be moved as well. The relocation was made in order to avoid the intersection with the Rheintalbahn, to create a bridge instead and especially to get rid of the railroad crossings in the city area.

Furthermore, the intersection with the already existing line to Günterstal of the Freiburg im Breisgau tramway, which existed since 1901, could be discontinued. There was a severe accident on 12 October 1916 because a tram, which was heading into town, disregarded the closed barrier in the darkness and collided with a railroad train going uphill. The tram and the line-keepers lodge got shattered while the tram driver, the conductor and the only passenger got slightly injured.

Two new tunnels had to be built for the new line: the one going through the Lorettoberg and the one beneath the Sternwald. The eastern border fault of the Upper Rhine Plain goes through the Lorettoberg. It can be seen through a ‘window’, which has been left open whilst bricking the tunnel so the further subsidence can be measured. In the course of the construction works, the line from the central station to Wiehre was increased to two tracks. The former train station Alter Wiehre Bahnhof (Old Wiehre Station) is now used for cultural activities, for example as a building for film and literature with the ‘Kommunales Kino Freiburg’ (municipal cinema Freiburg), the 'Literaturbüro Freiburg' (lit.: literature office Freiburg) and it also houses a café.

== Route ==
After leaving Freiburg Hauptbahnhof, the Höllentalbahn diverges from the mainline Mannheim–Karlsruhe–Basel railway to the east. It then crosses over the mainline on a flyover and serves two further stops within the city, before starting its ascent of the Höllental.

High points on the stretch of the line through the Höllental include the Hirschsprungfelsen (a rock formation) and a crossing of the Ravenna Gorge on the 40-metre (131 ft) high Ravenna Bridge. The section of the line between Hirschsprung and Hinterzarten has a steep maximum gradient of 5.5%, betraying its origin as a rack railway.

After leaving the Höllental, the Dreiseenbahn railway to Seebrugg diverges at the spa town of Titisee, close to the Titisee lake. The town of Neustadt follows; since the electrification of the section to Donaueschingen in 2019, passengers do not have to change trains there anymore.

Further on, between Neustadt and Donaueschingen, the viaduct at the former Kappel Gutachbrücke station crosses the Wutach at the beginning of its long gorge. While in a 535-metre (1,755 ft) tunnel near Döggingen station, the line crosses a main European watershed between the Rhine drainage basin (flowing into the North Sea) and the Danube drainage basin (flowing into the Black Sea).

== Construction engineering ==
The Höllentalbahn has 15 tunnels on its railway section. Nine of them are on the section between Freiburg and Neustadt (front section) and six of them are on the section between Neustadt and Donaueschingen (back section). The longest tunnel is the Dögginger Tunnel with a length of 535 metres. It passes beneath the European watershed between the Black Sea and the North Sea. All the tunnels on the back section between Neustadt and Donaueschingen were built with the building of the railway section; in contrast to the front section between Freiburg and Neustadt, where the Sternwald-Tunnel with a length of 514 metres and the Loretto-Tunnel with a length of 302 metres were built with the relocation of the railway section between Freiburg main station and Freiburg-Littenweiler in 1934. The lower Hirschsprung tunnel was originally 121 metres long but was then shortened to 114 metres after World War II.

== Gallery ==
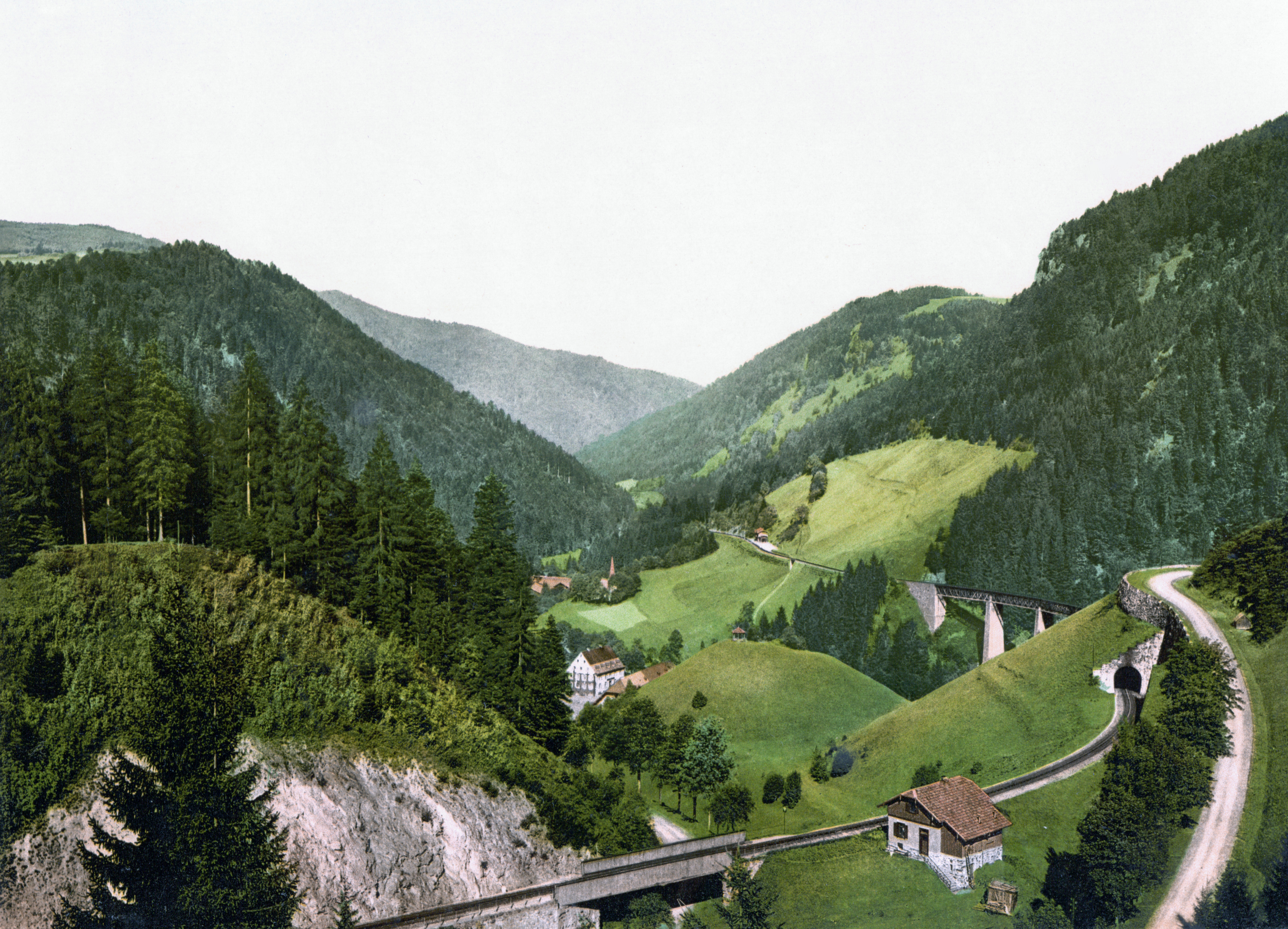
The Höllentalbahn around 1900

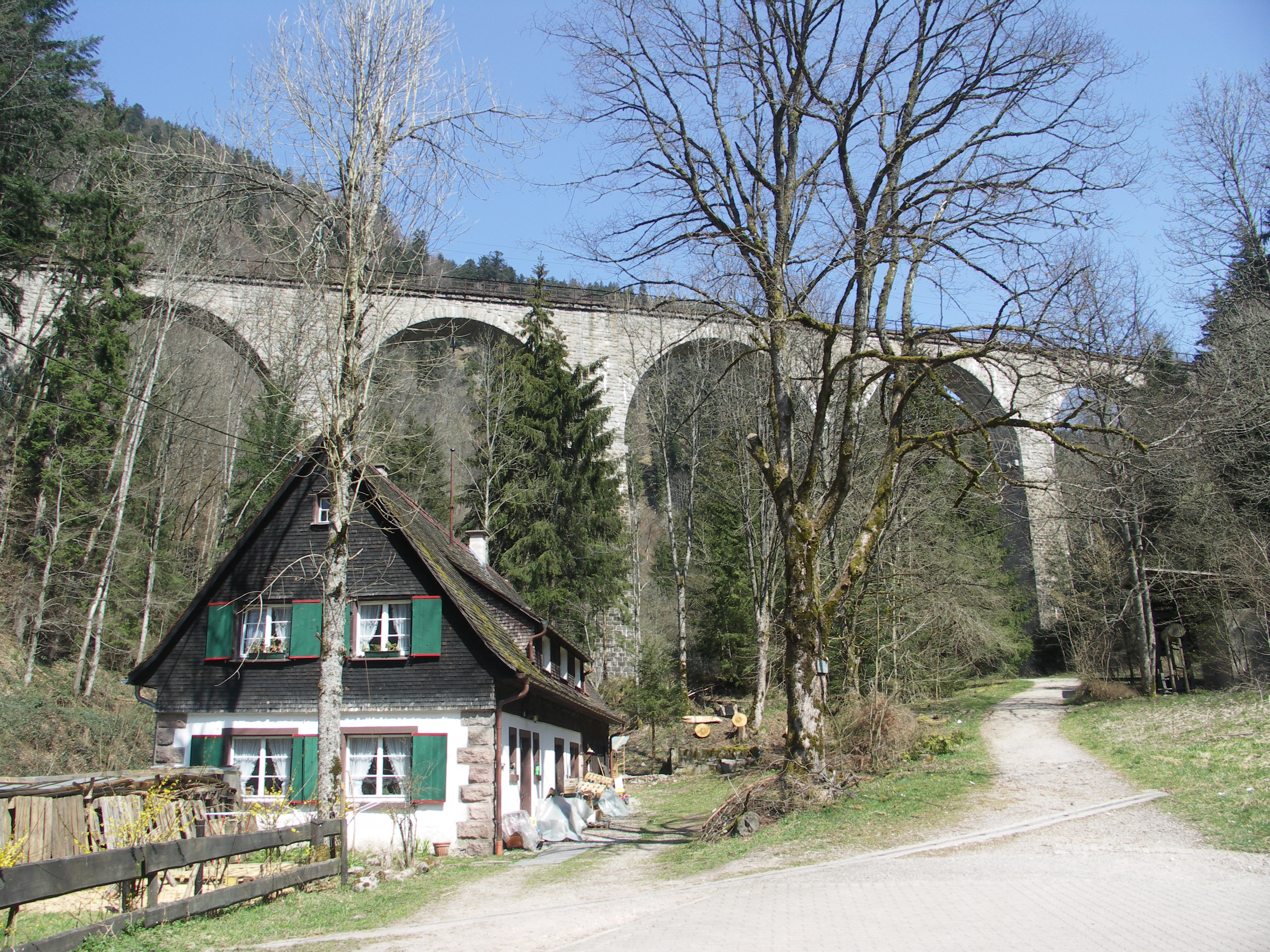
Ravenna Bridge

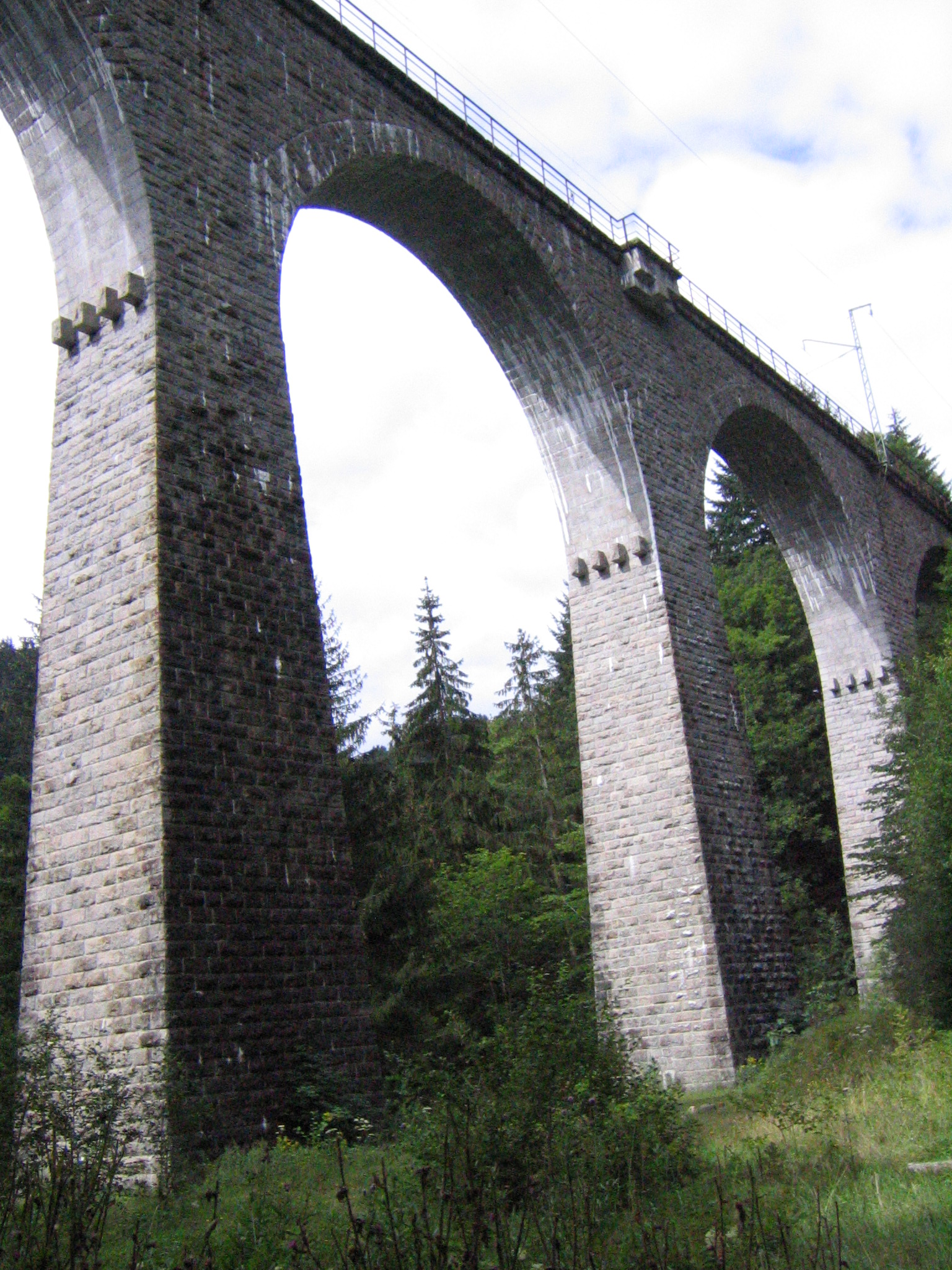
Ravenna Bridge

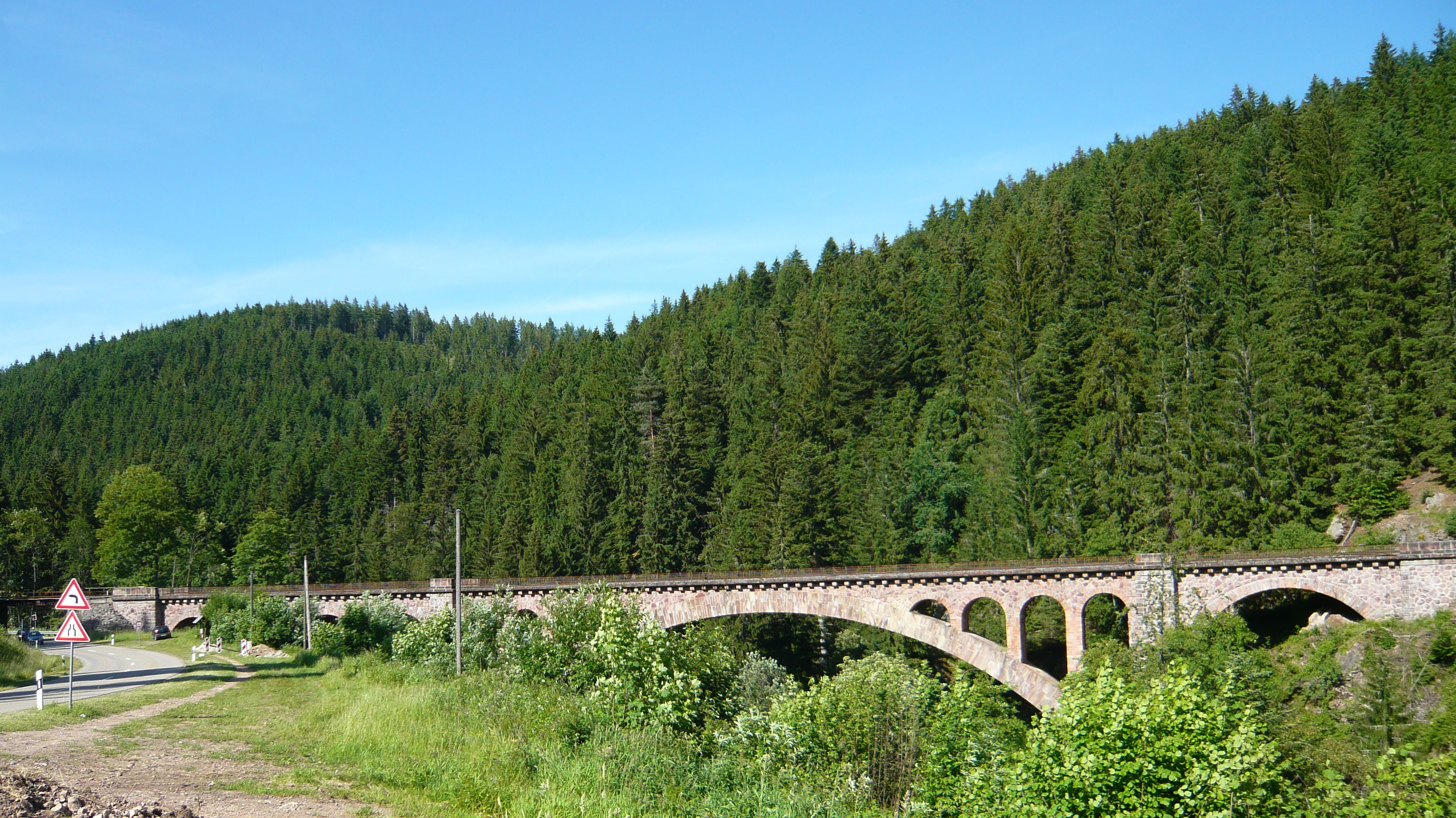
Gutach Bridge

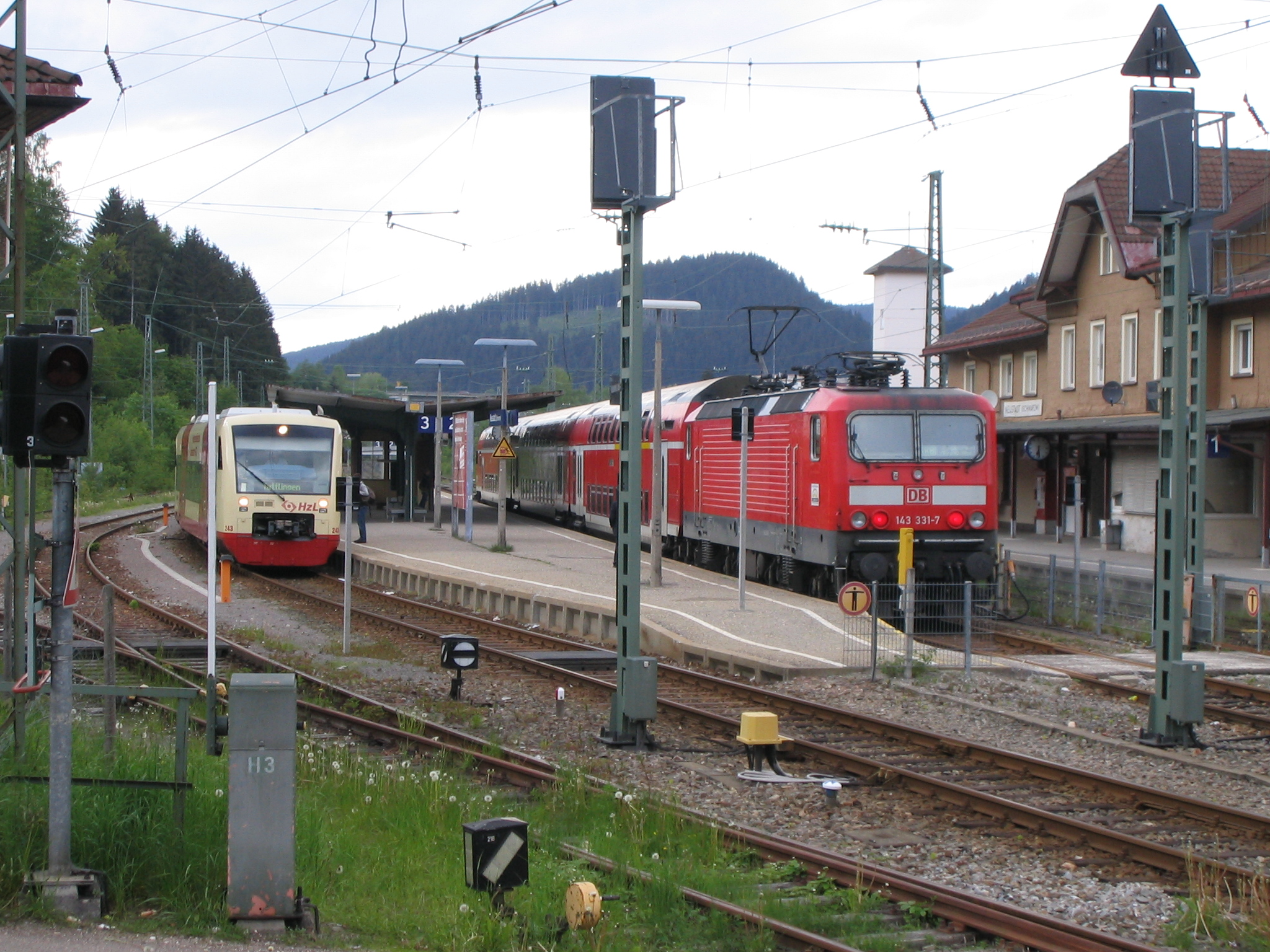
Electric and diesel trains meet at Neustadt

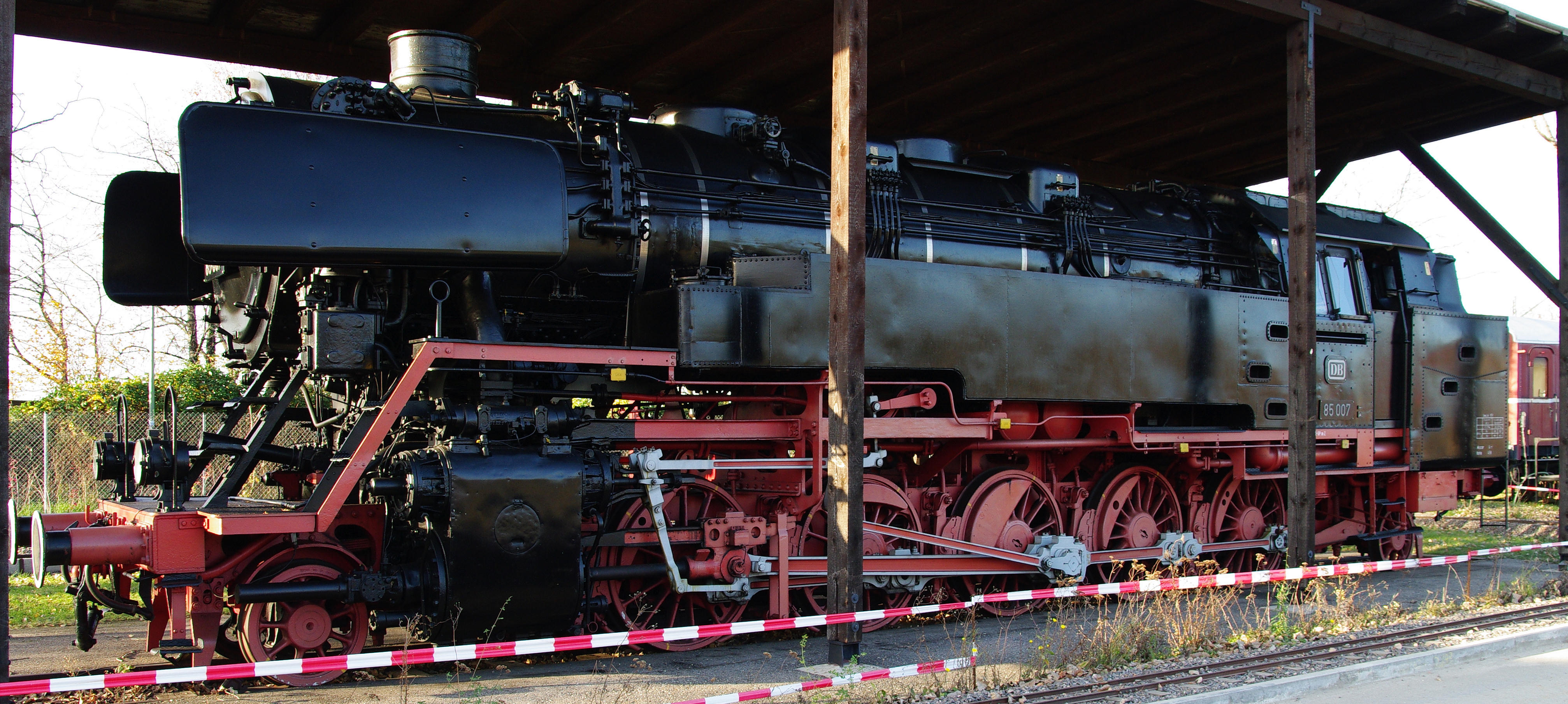
DRG/DB Class 85 engine

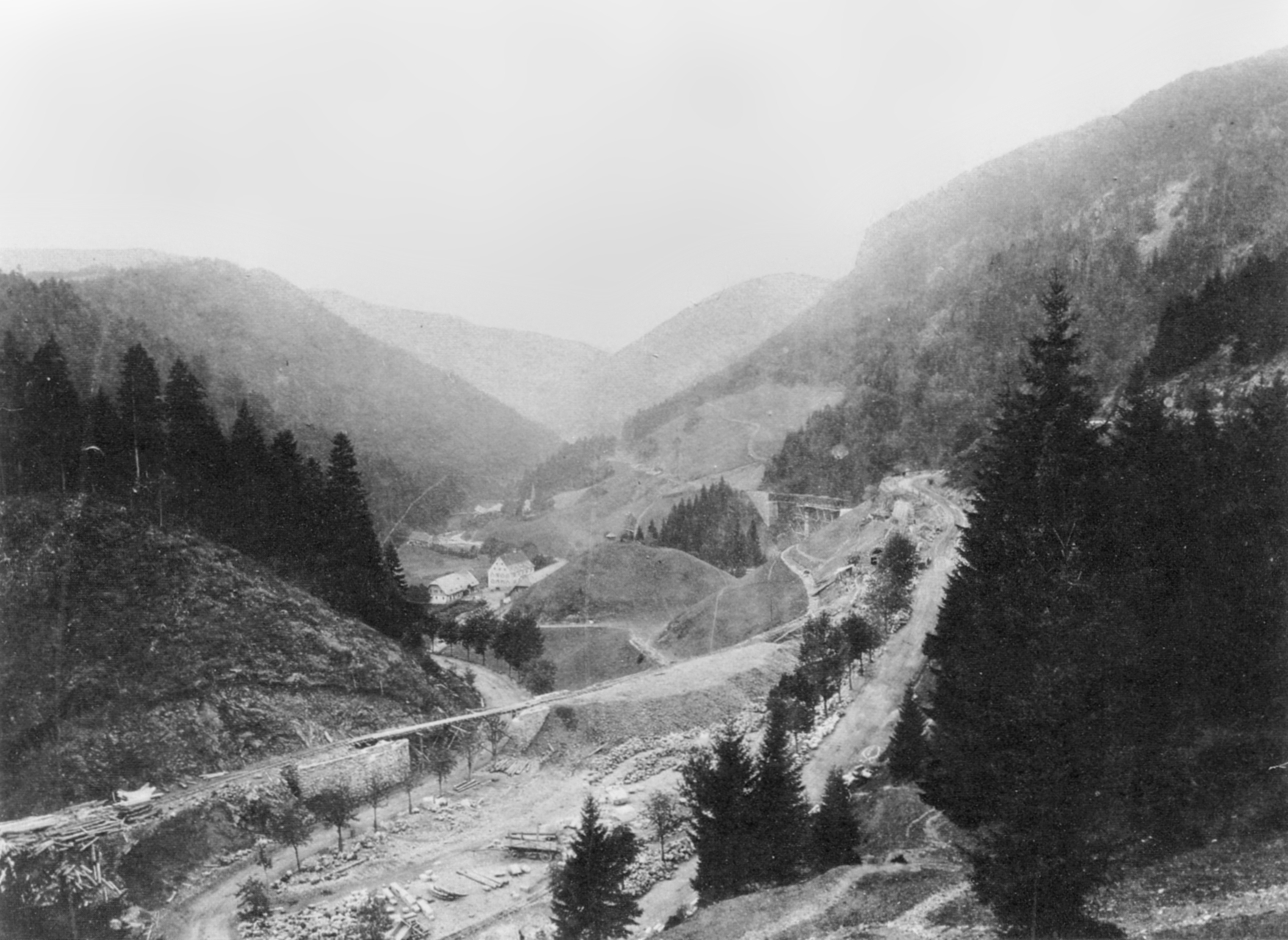
Construction of the track

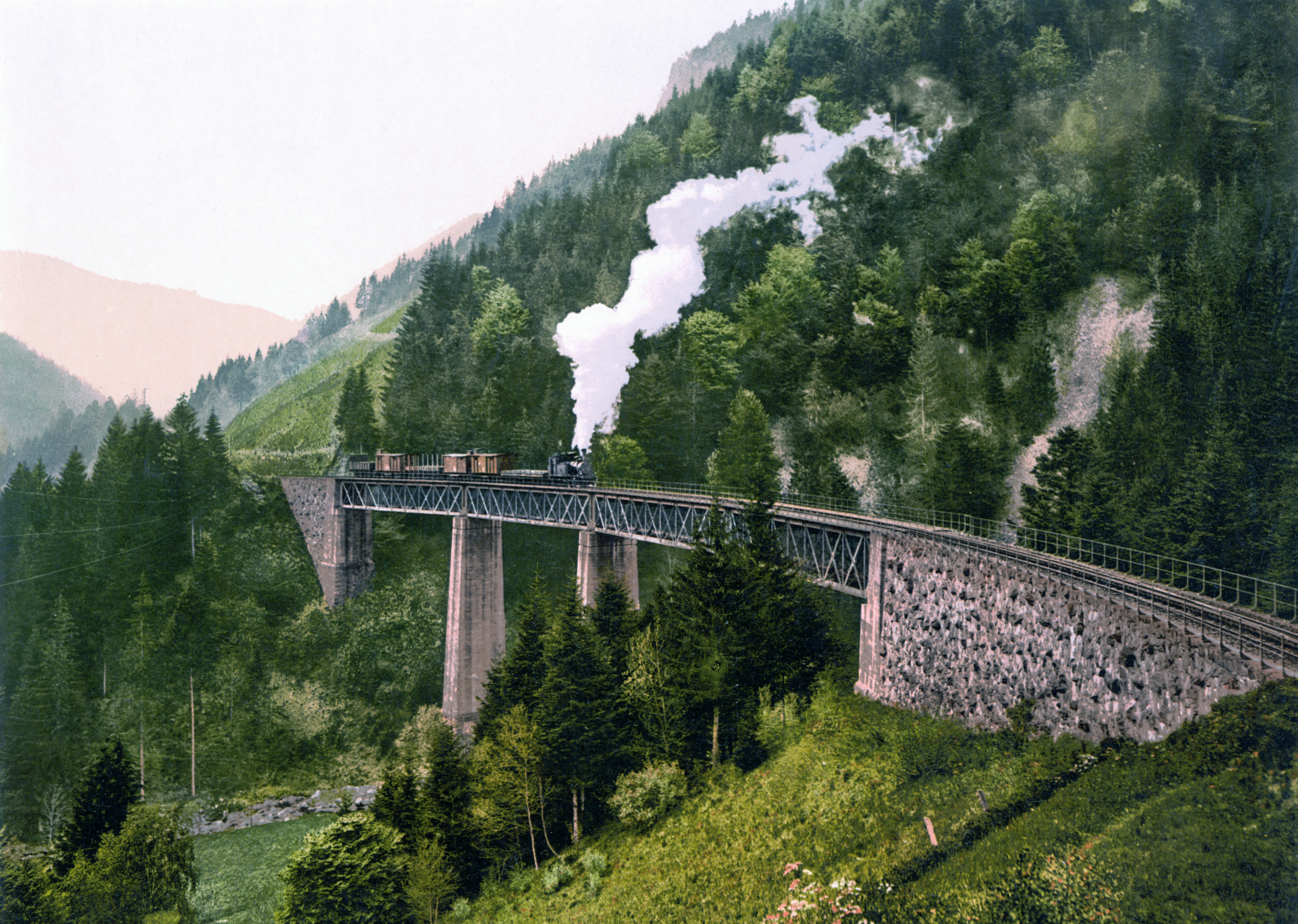
Old ravenna bridge

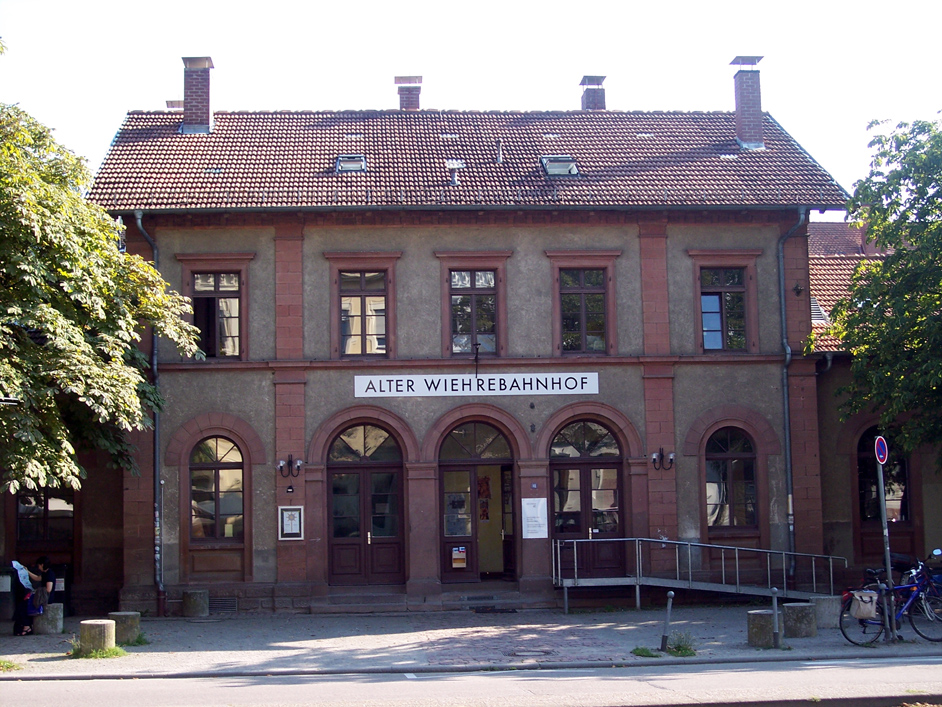
Old Wiehre station

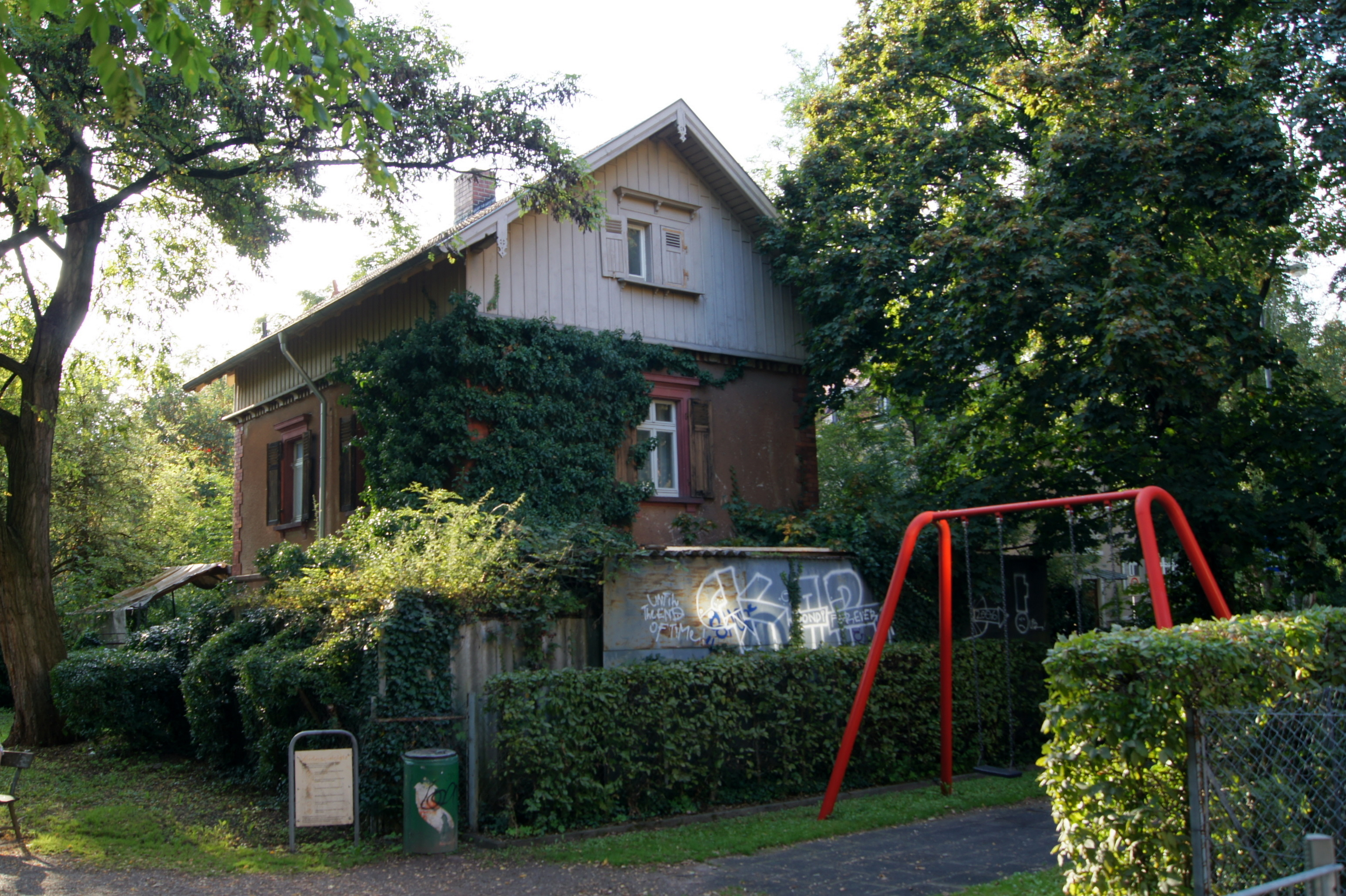
Old level-crossing house

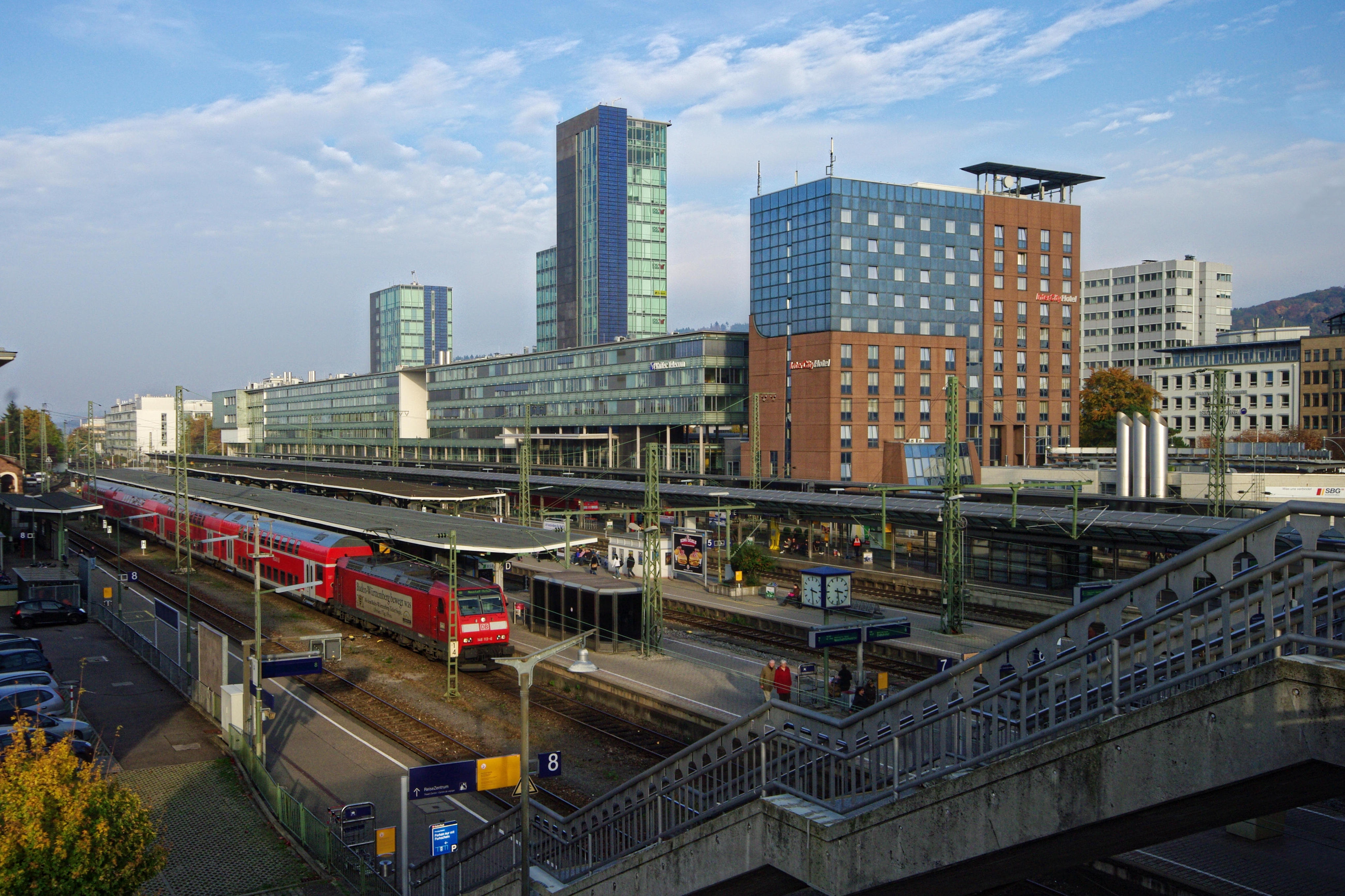
Freiburg (Breisgau) main station

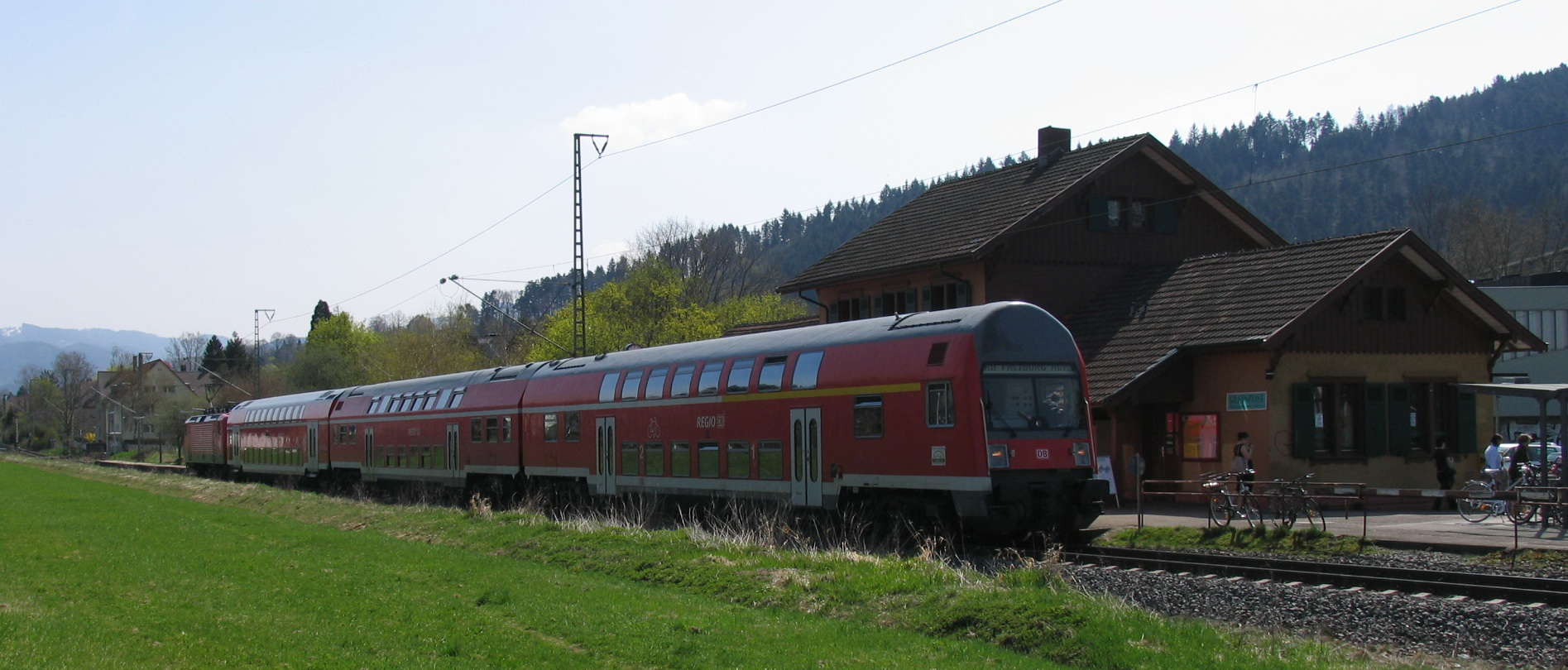
Freiburg Littenweiler halt

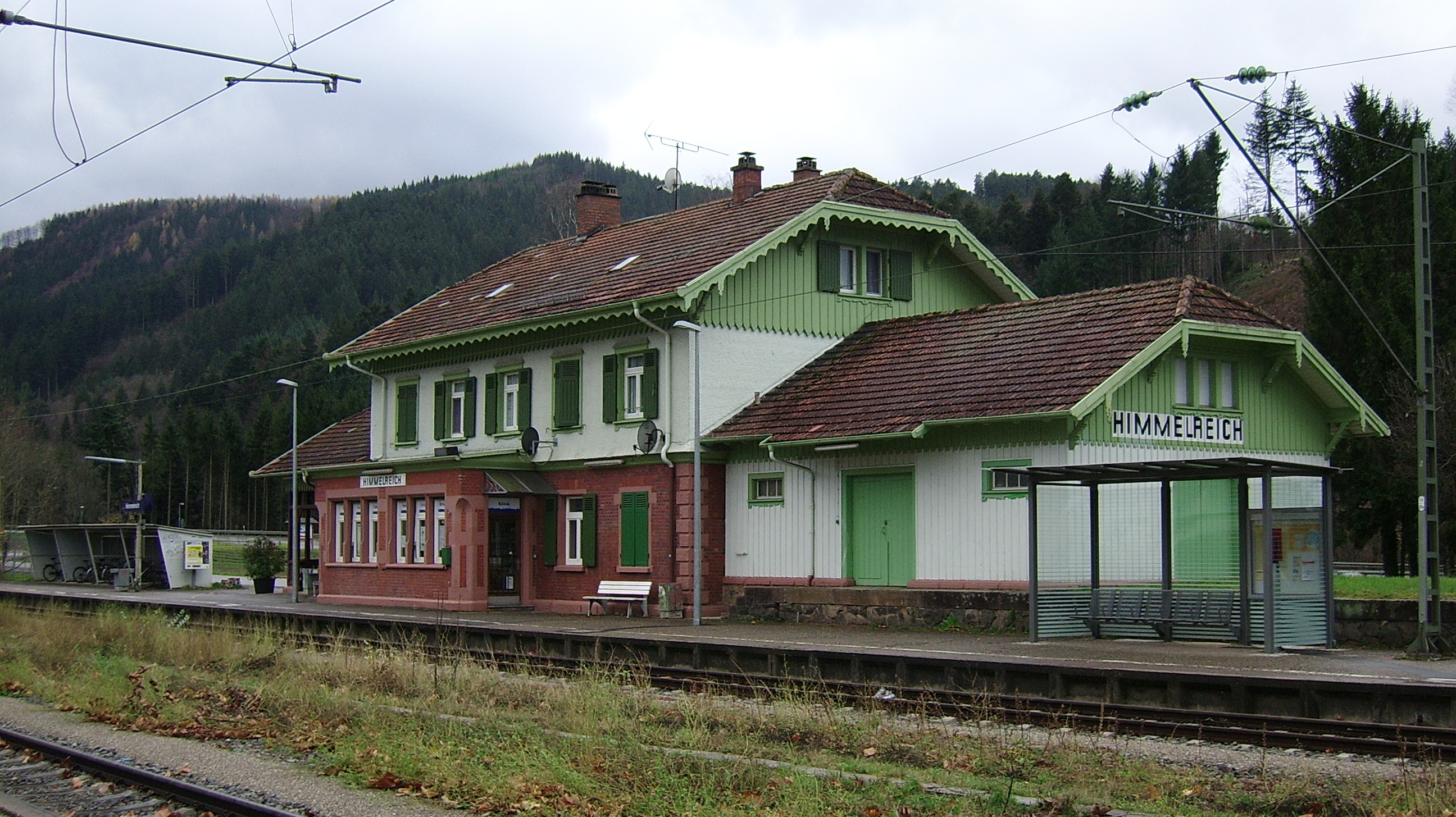
Himmelreich station

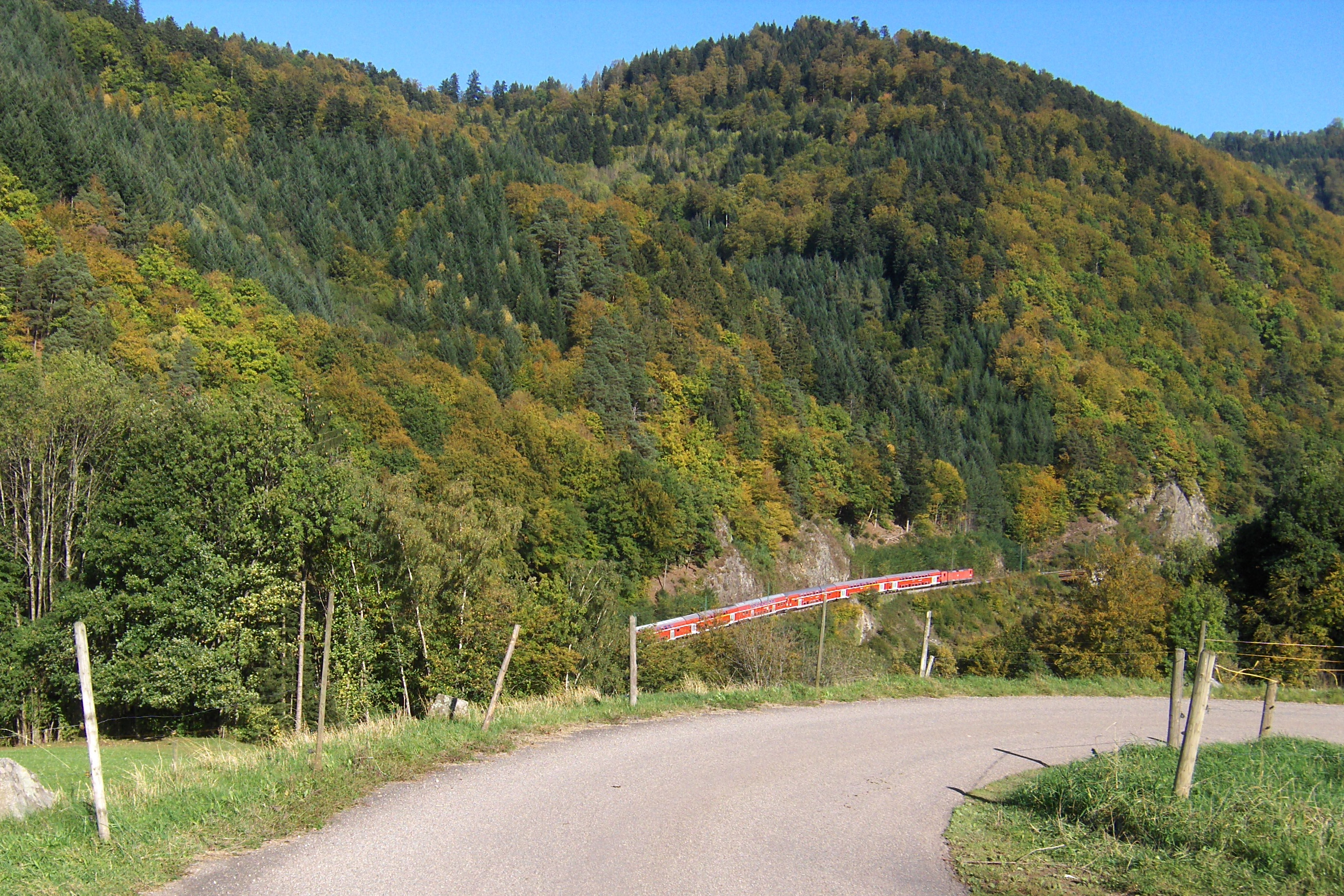
Beginning of the Hell Valley

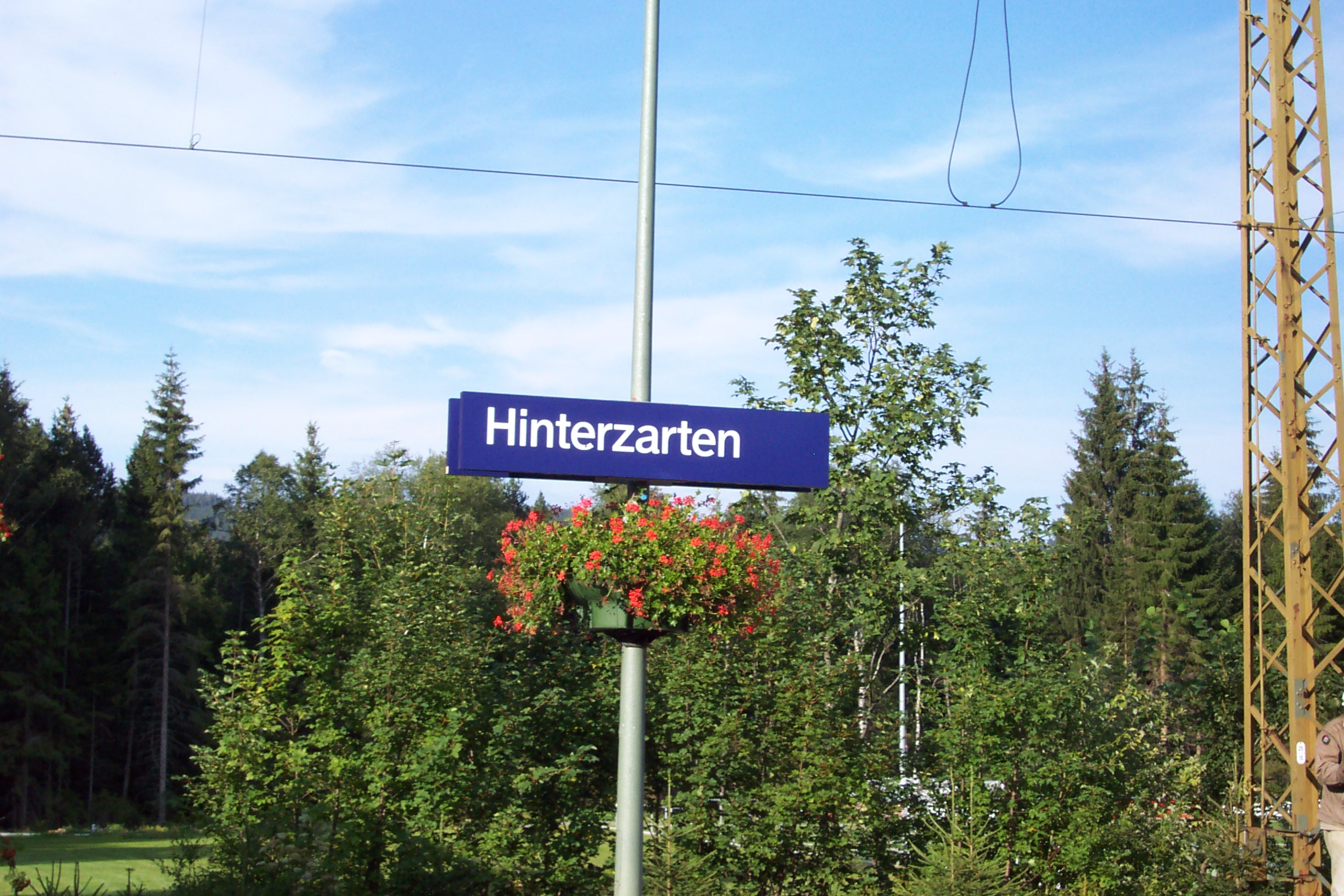
Hinterzarten station

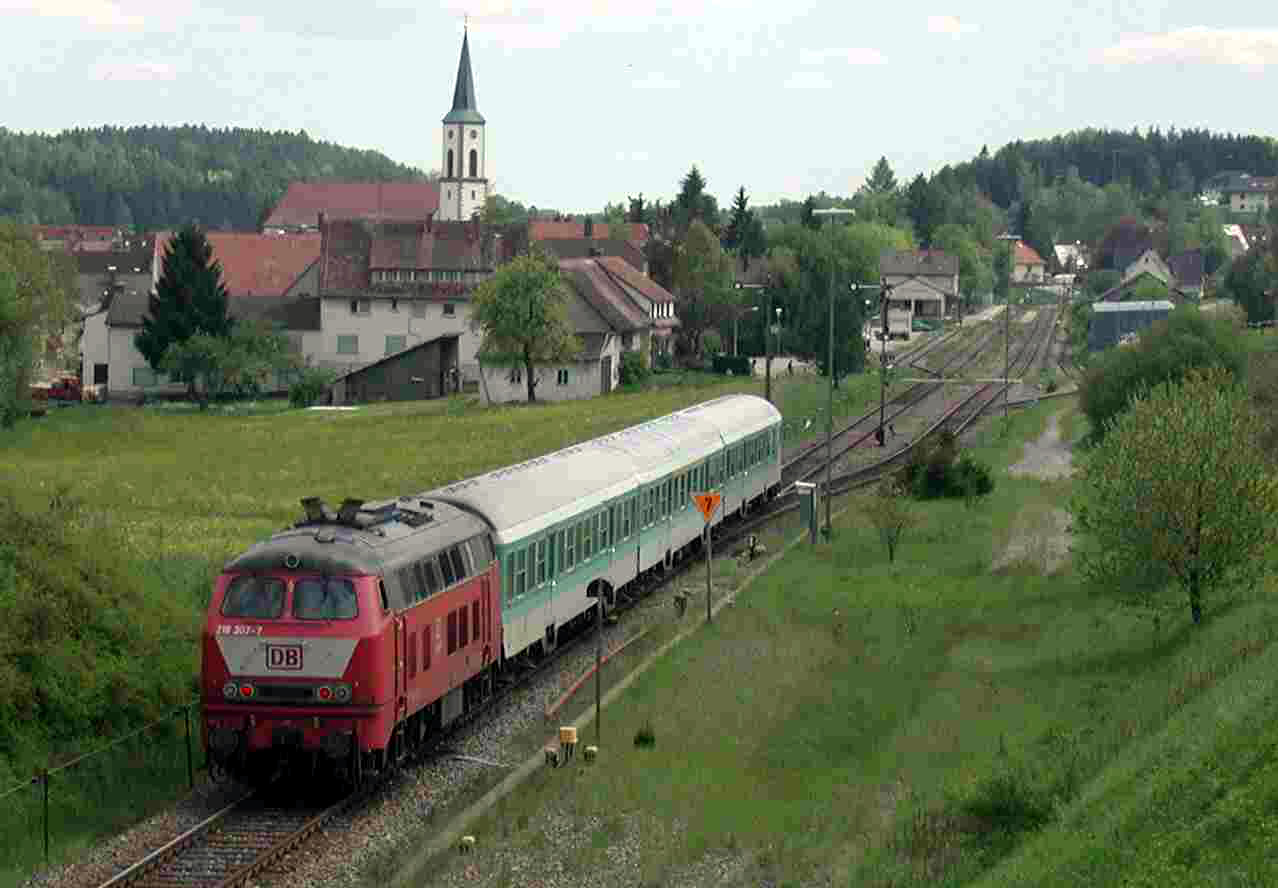
Train near Löffingen station
