= Ravenna Gorge =

German gorge in the Black Forest

Coordinates: 47°55′11″N 8°5′6″E

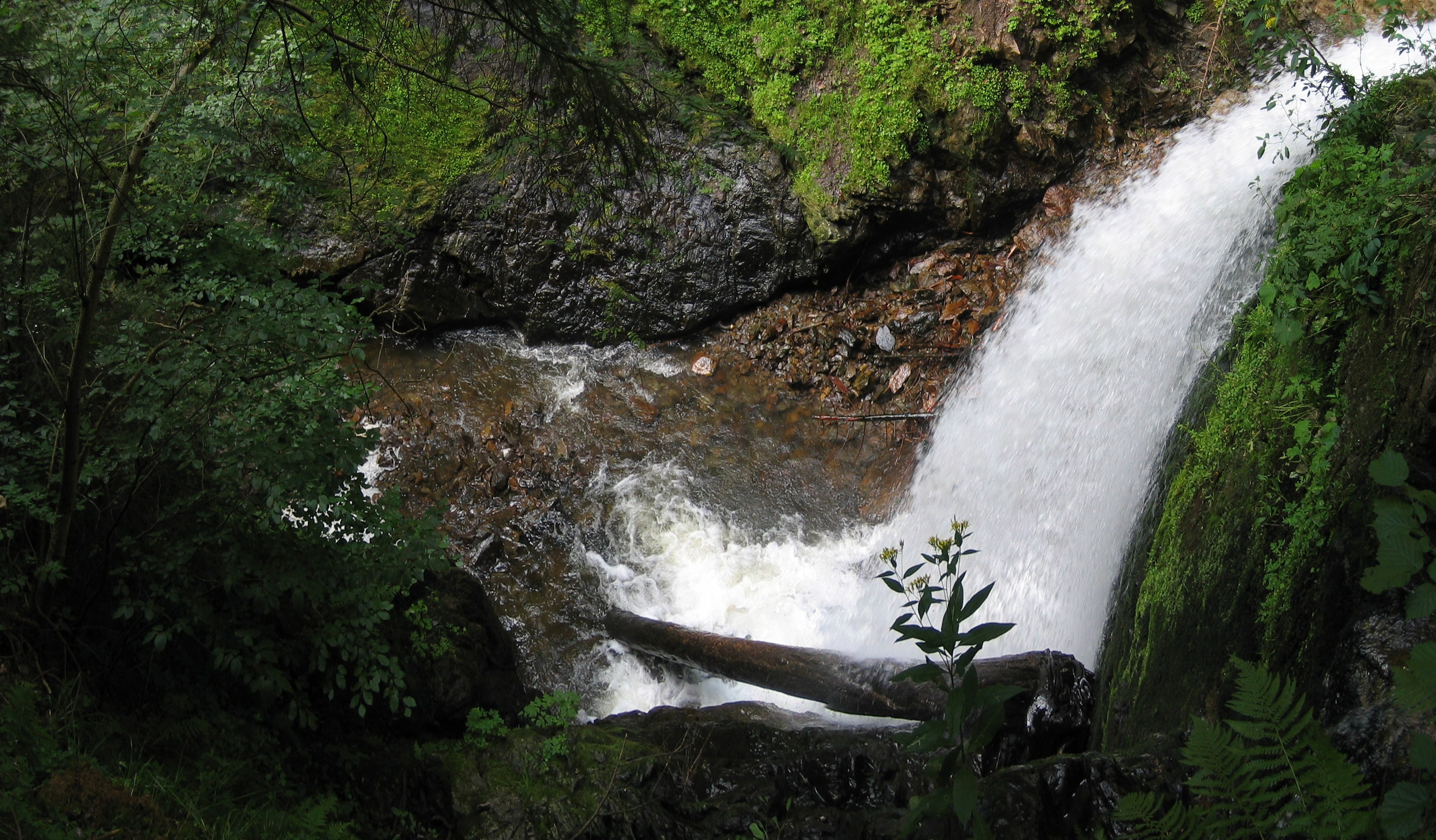
Great Ravenna Fall

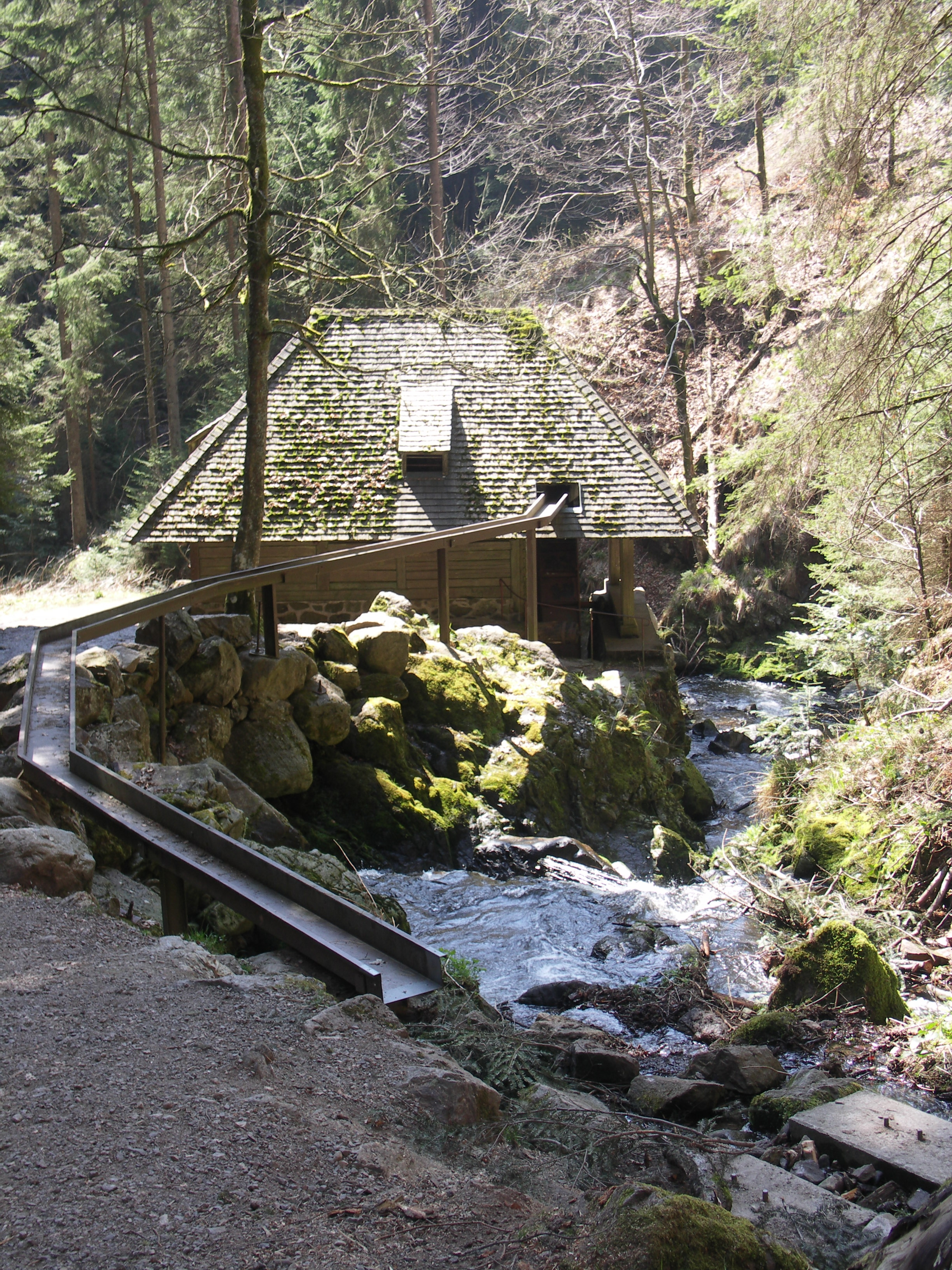
The Großjockenmühle mill in the Ravenna Gorge

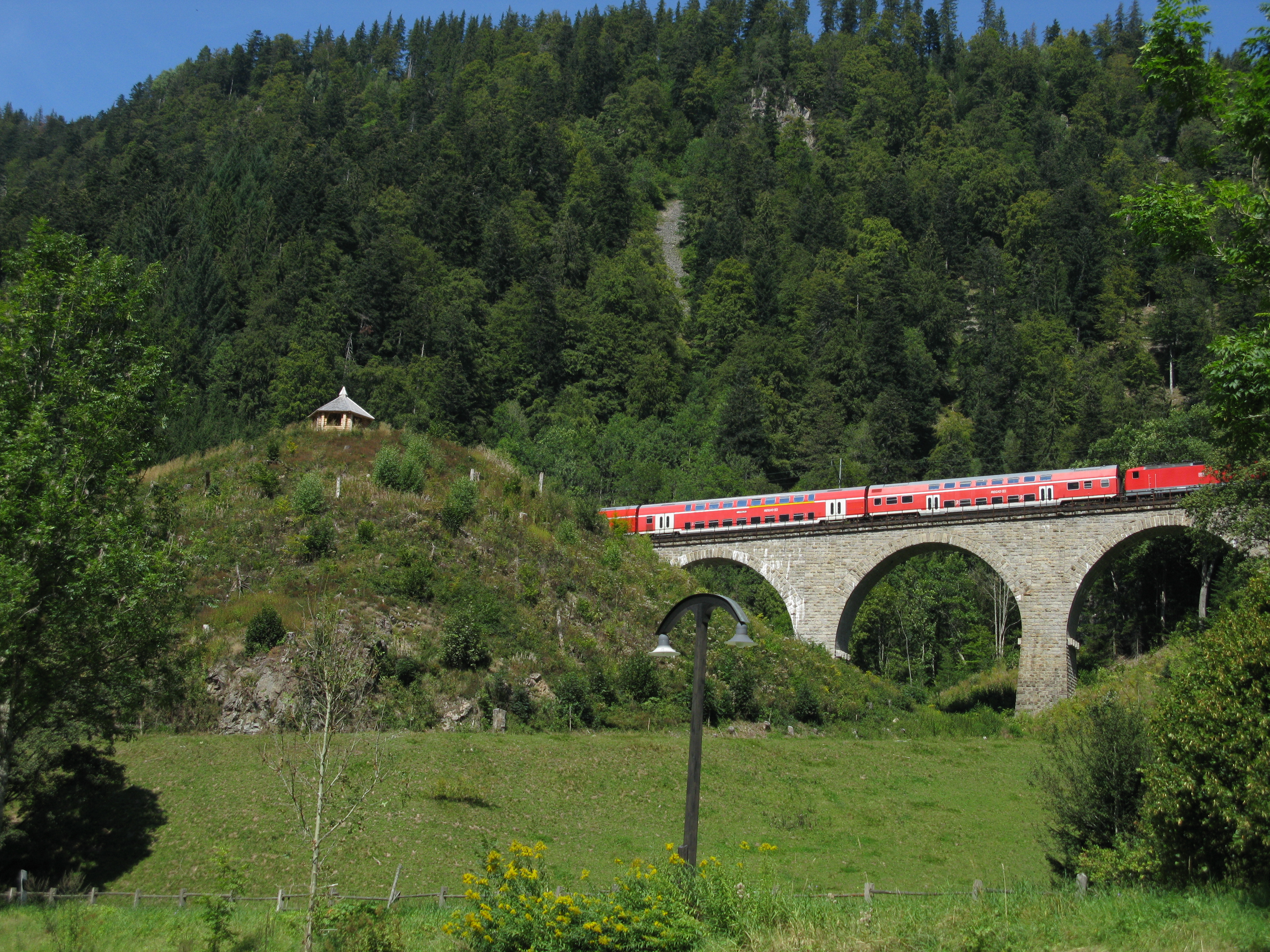
The Ravenna Bridge, the Galgenbühl and Höllental Railway

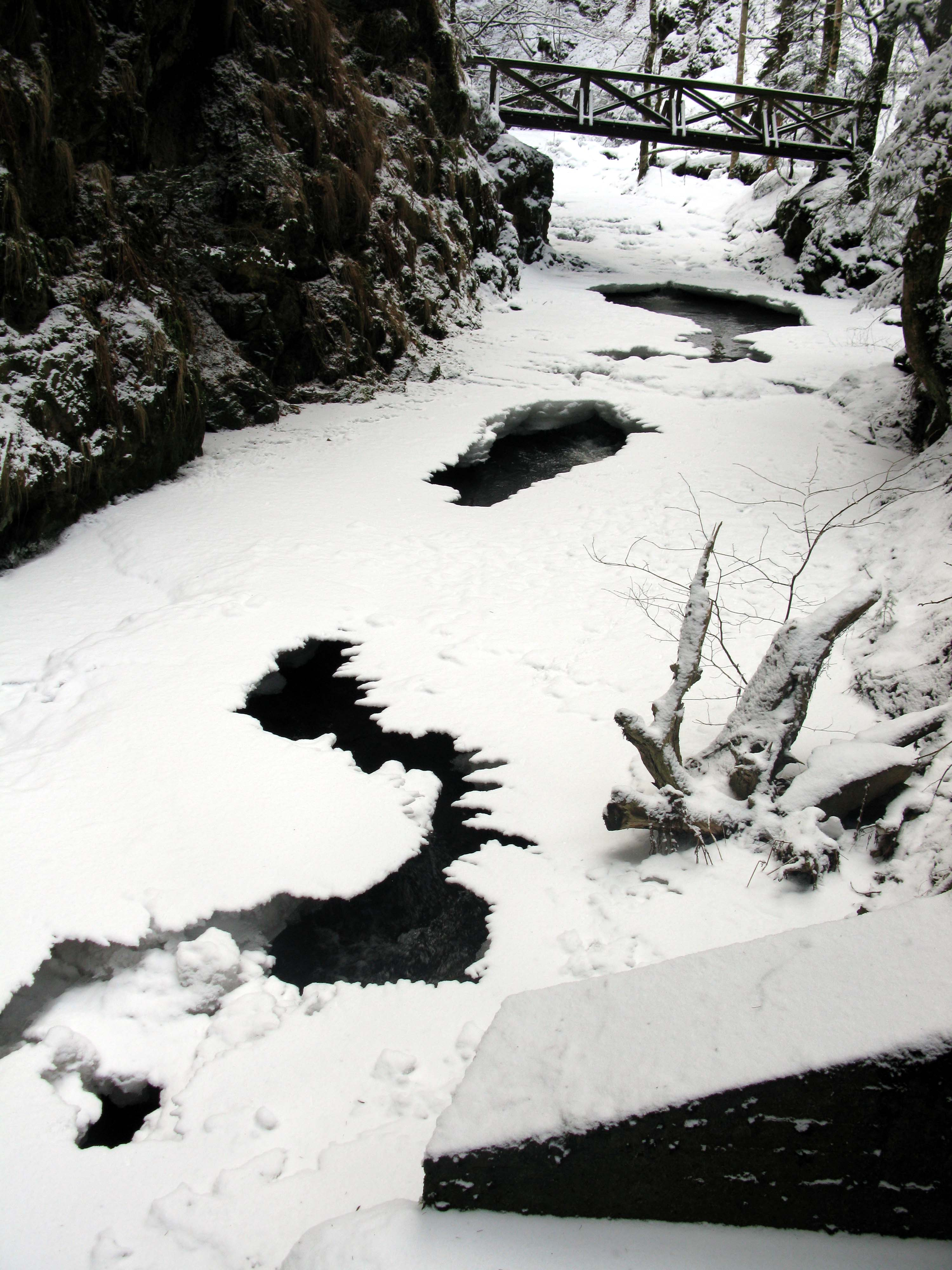
The Ravenna Gorge in winter

The Ravenna Gorge (German: Ravennaschlucht) is a gorge in the Black Forest in southwest Germany. It is a narrow side valley of the Höllental, through which the Ravenna stream flows. A trail also runs through the ravine as part of the Black Forest Homeland Path (Heimatpfad Hochschwarzwald). The roughly four-kilometre-long gorge runs from the Höllental up to the village of Breitnau on the plateau and lies within its municipal boundaries. The name of the gorge is probably derived from the French word ravine which means "gorge".

The wild mountain brook of the Ravenna tumbles over several waterfalls in the gorge. The two biggest falls are the Great Ravenna Fall (Großer Ravennafall) which is 16 metres high and the Little Ravenna Fall (Kleiner Ravennafall) which descends through a height of 6 metres.

In former times, there were several water mills along the stream. Some are still visible today within the gorge and one or two are well preserved. At the upper end of the gorge is the mill of Großjockenmühle which dates to 1883 and is a protected monument. A feature of this mill is that, due to the steep descent of the Ravenna, the water is led over the roof of the mill onto the water wheel.

The lower part of the gorge is spanned by the 37-metre-high Ravenna Bridge, the viaduct of the Höllental Railway. Also here is Saint Oswald’s Chapel (built 1148) and the Hotel Hofgut Sternen, in which Marie Antoinette stayed in 1770 and Goethe in 1779.

In front of the Ravenna Bridge is the Galgenbühl, a knoll about 30 metres high. There used to be a gallows (Galgen) here, where executions were carried out. Later a pavilion was built here which fell into ruins over the course of time. The slopes were originally used as pasture, but in the 1950s the mountain was afforested with spruce and Douglas fir. In 2010 all the trees were felled, however, and a new pavilion erected on the Galgenbühl. It is covered with shingles made of thuja wood.
