= Kirchzarten =

- Municipality
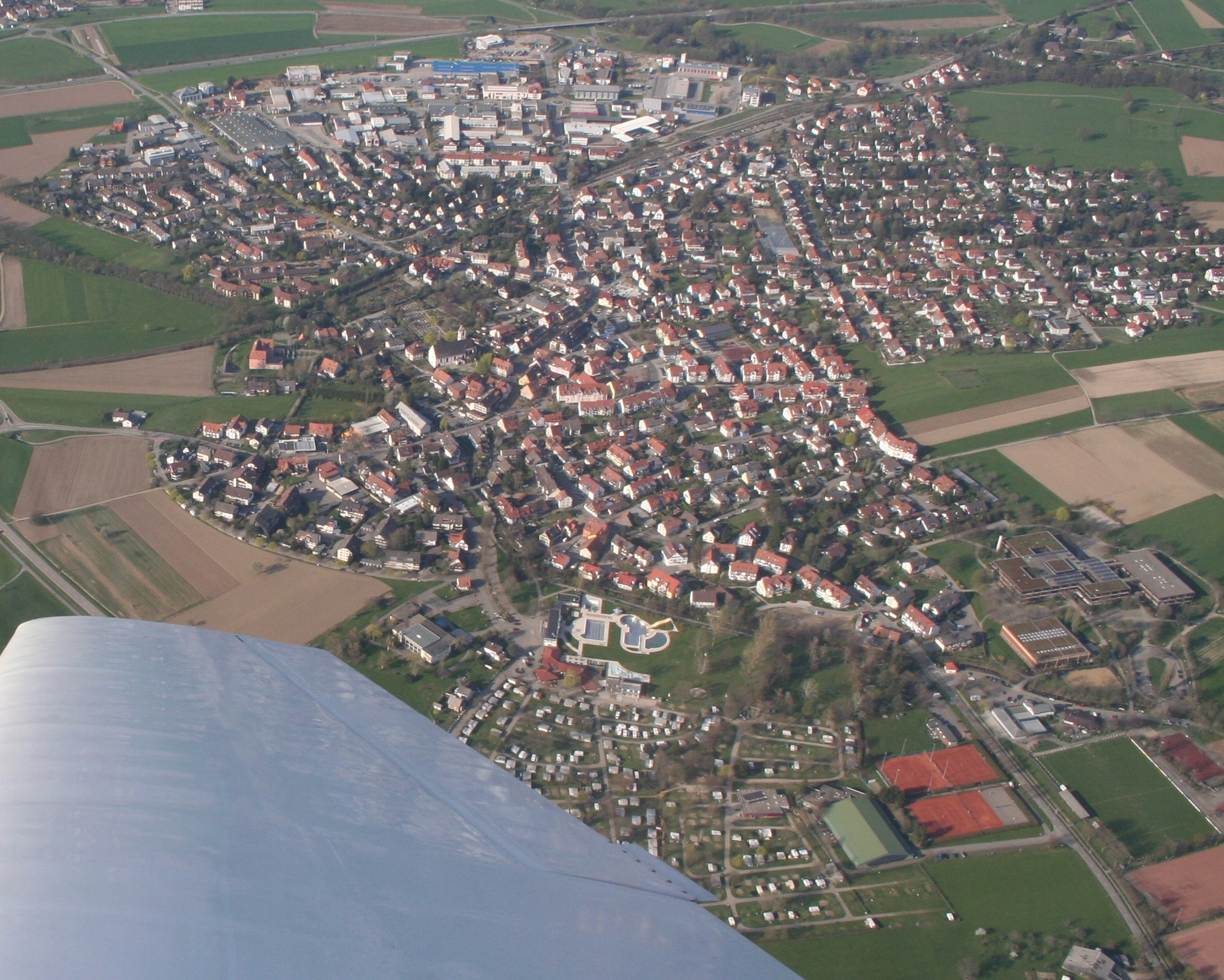
- Aerial view of Kirchzarten

- Coat of arms

- Location of Kirchzarten within Breisgau-Hochschwarzwald district
- Interactive map of Kirchzarten
- Location within Germany Location within Baden-Württemberg
- Coordinates: 47°57′54″N 7°57′20″E
- Country: Germany
- State: Baden-Württemberg
- Admin. region: Freiburg
- District: Breisgau-Hochschwarzwald

Government
  - Mayor (2016–24): Andreas Hall (CDU)

Area
  - Total: 21.13 km^{2} (8.16 sq mi)
- Elevation: 380 m (1,250 ft)

Population (2025-12-31)
  - Total: 10,364
  - Density: 490.5/km^{2} (1,270/sq mi)
- Time zone: UTC+01:00 (CET)
  - Summer (DST): UTC+02:00 (CEST)
- Postal codes: 79199
- Dialling codes: 07661
- Vehicle registration: FR
- Website: www.kirchzarten.de

Kirchzarten (German pronunciation: [ˈkɪʁçˌtsaʁtn̩]) is a municipality in the district of Breisgau-Hochschwarzwald in the federal-state of Baden-Württemberg in southwestern Germany.

A Zionist agricultural training farm was founded in Kirchzarten in 1919 to prepare young people to become farmers in Mandatory Palestine [Eretz Israel].

The Kirchzarten synagogue had a set of Jugendstil windows by artist Friedrich Adler, who made a duplicate set now in the Tel Aviv Museum of Art.

== Demographics ==
Population development:

Year	Inhabitants
1990	8,726
2001	9,530
2011	9,603
2021	10,030

== Gallery ==
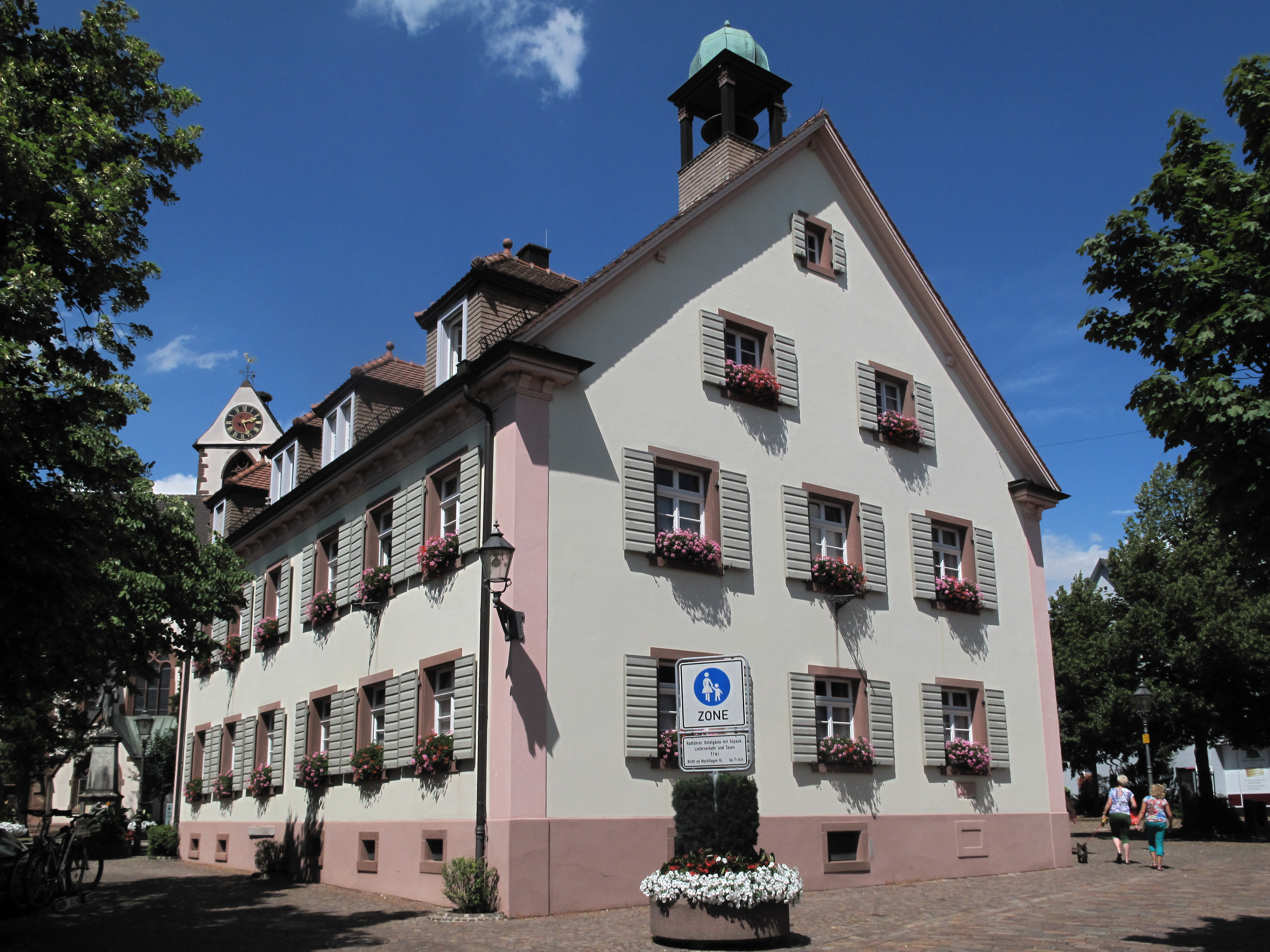
Kirchzarten, town hall

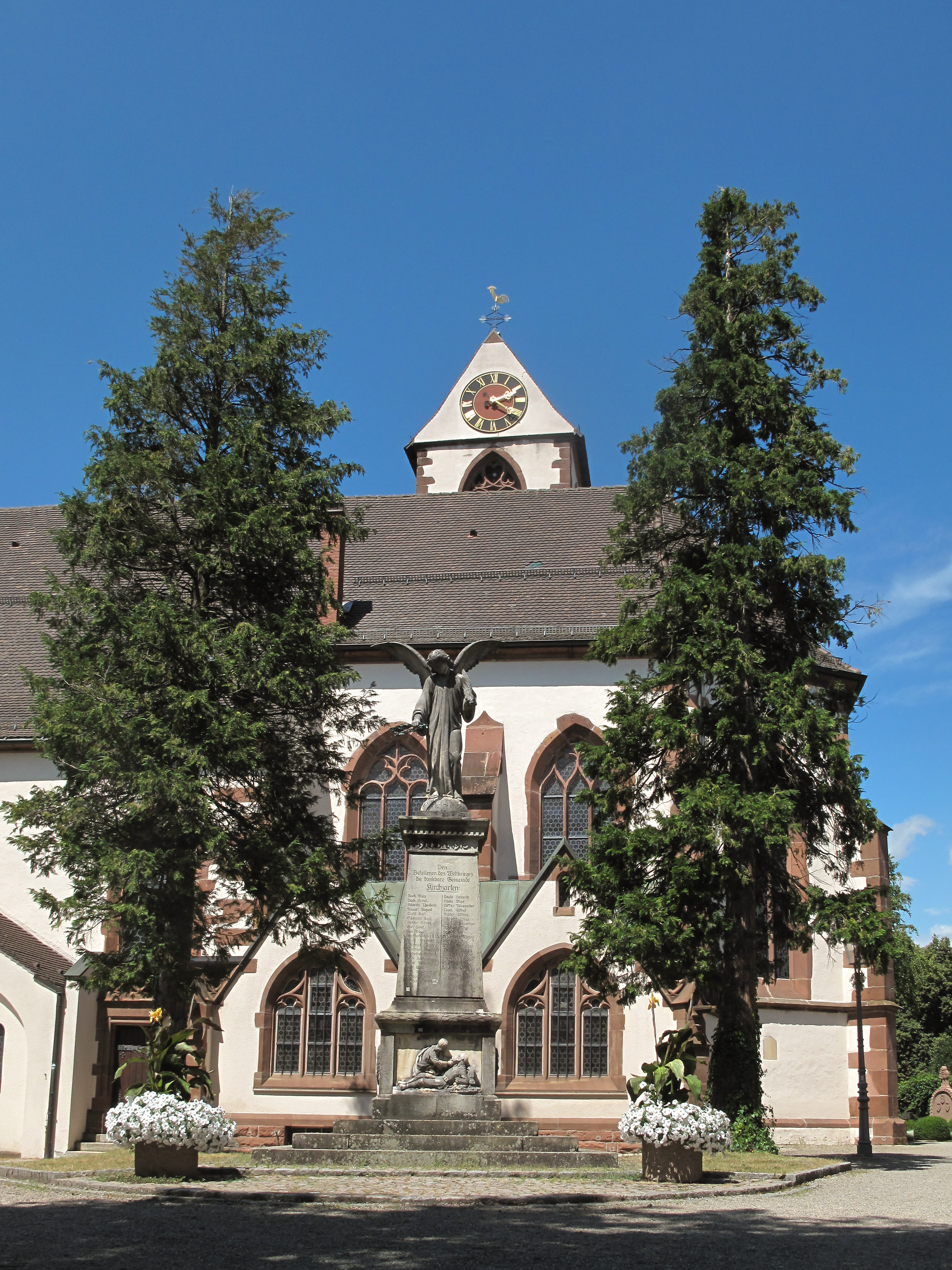
Kirchzarten, Church of Saint Gall

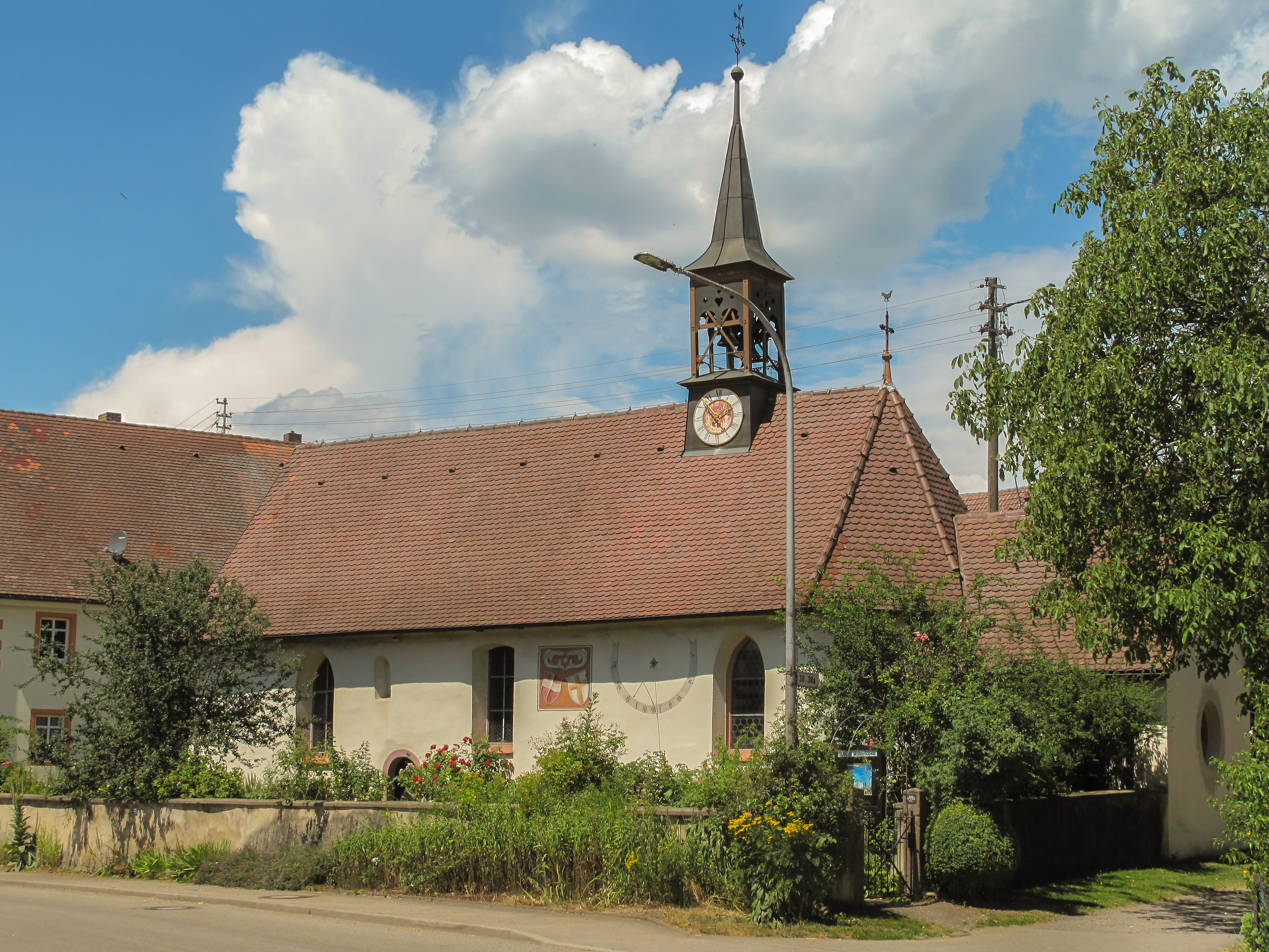
Zarten, church

== See also ==
Kirchzarten Airfield
