= St. Peter and Paul, Bonndorf im Schwarzwald =

Church in Bonndorf im Schwarzwald

St. Peter and Paul is the Roman Catholic parish church of Bonndorf im Schwarzwald in the Waldshut district of Baden-Württemberg, Germany. Constructed in the Rundbogenstil (Romanesque Revival) influenced by Heinrich Hübsch and designed by Josef Berckmüller, this three-nave pseudobasilica features a façade tower and a three-sided apse. It replaced a monastery church destroyed by fire in 1842, built at a new location. After multiple plan revisions, construction was completed in 1850. However, the parish community was dissatisfied with the initial interior furnishings, leading to a thorough renovation and decoration by Franz Joseph Simmler between approximately 1893 and 1900. The church's interior was restored between 1972 and 1974 to preserve this state.

Together with its affiliated churches in Ebnet, Wellendingen, and Wittlekofen, the parish belongs to the Bonndorf-Wutach pastoral unit in the Waldshut deanery of the Archdiocese of Freiburg.

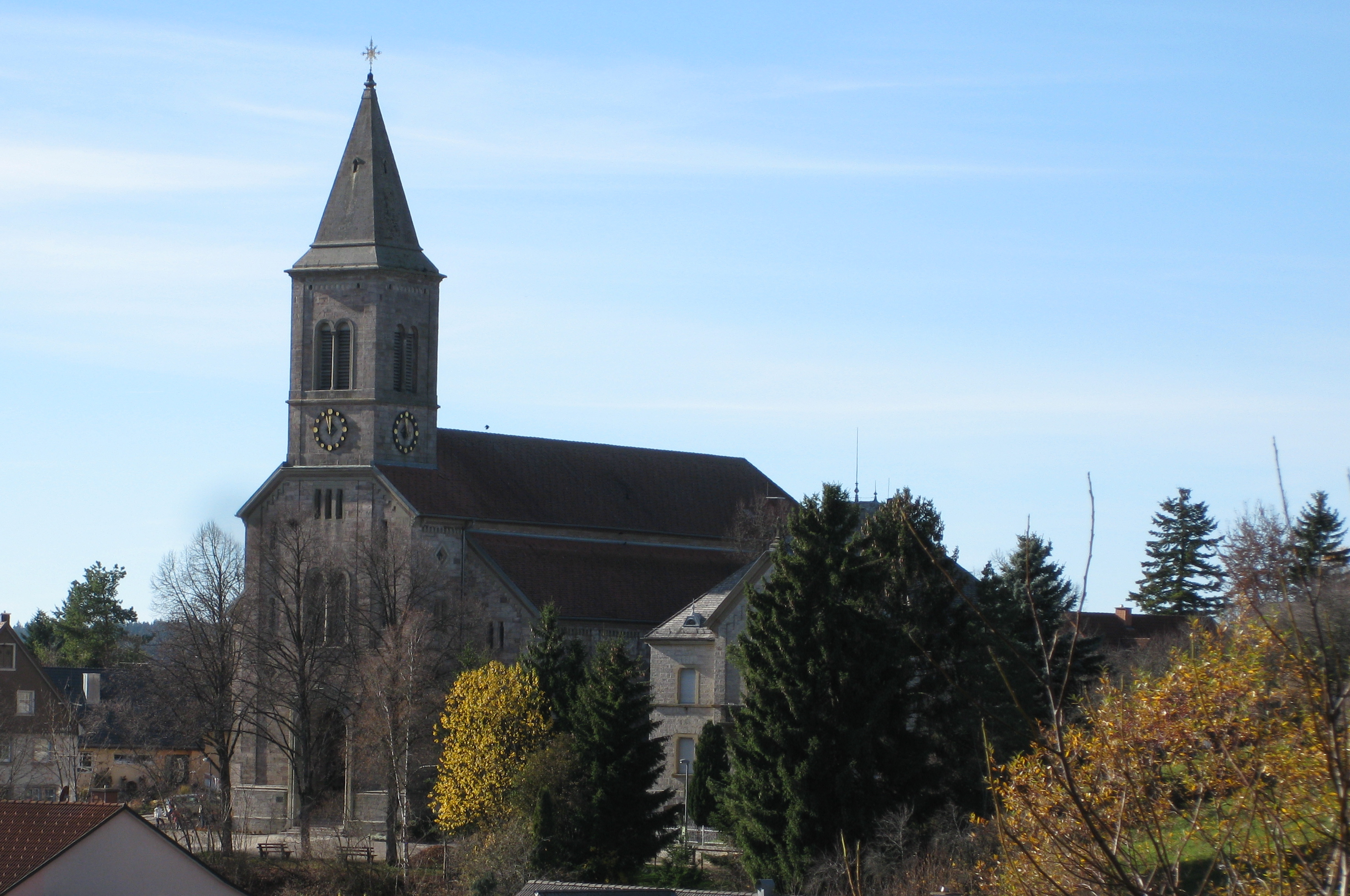
St. Peter and Paul from Philosophenweg

== Parish history ==
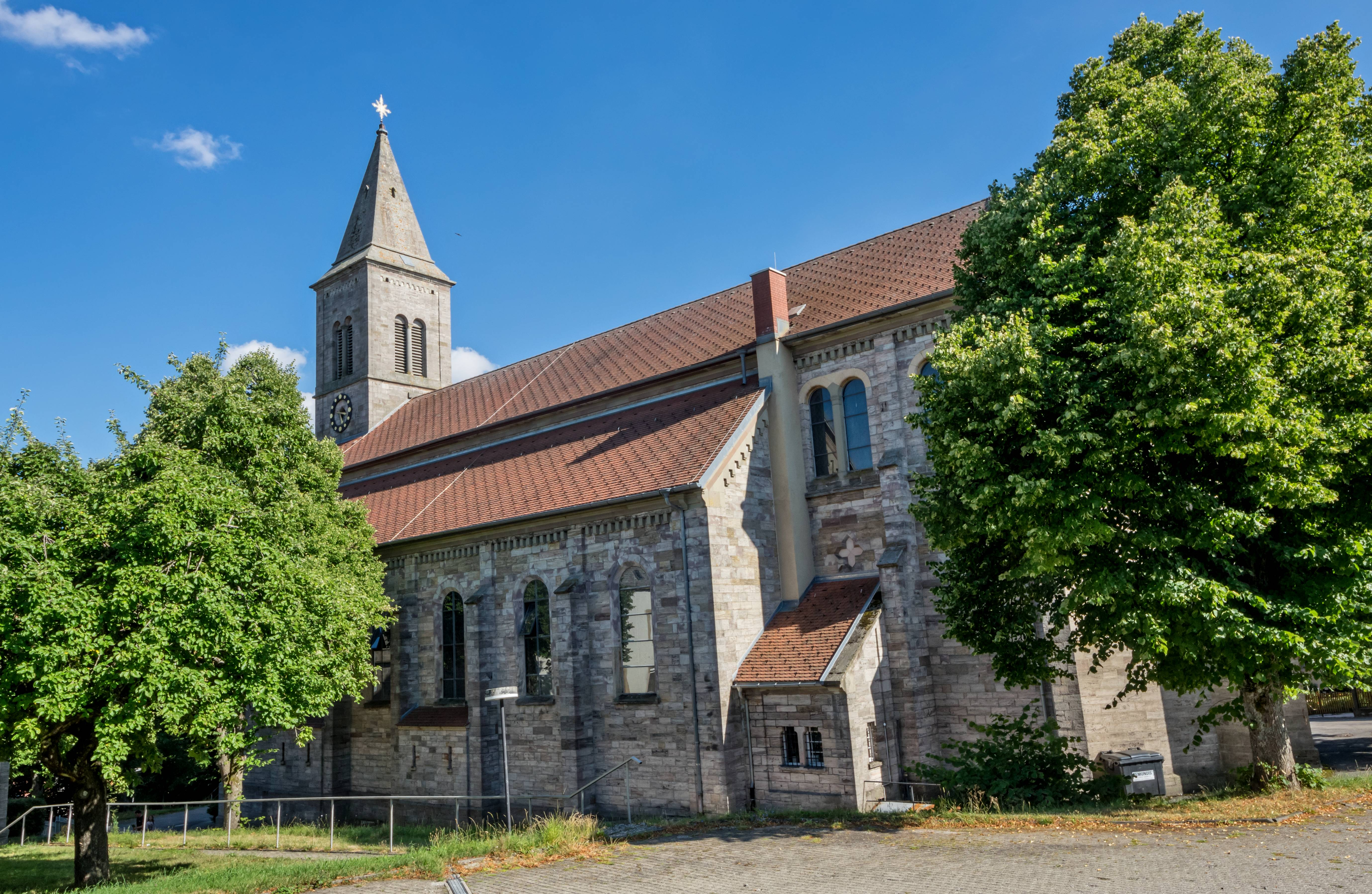
St. Peter and Paul from the northwest

Bonndorf was first mentioned in 800 as “Pondorf,” with the parish documented in 1223 through the mention of a pleban (parish priest). By the late 14th century, the parish was vacant. In 1402, Rudolf von Wolfurt and his wife Elisabeth von Krenkingen, with the approval of their son Wolf and the local council, founded a Pauliner monastery, transferring the parish church to it for incorporation. The Pauliner monks subsequently provided the parish priests. In 1731, records mention the reconstruction of monastery buildings, with timber supplied by St. Blaise Abbey, which had owned the Bonndorf lordship since 1612.

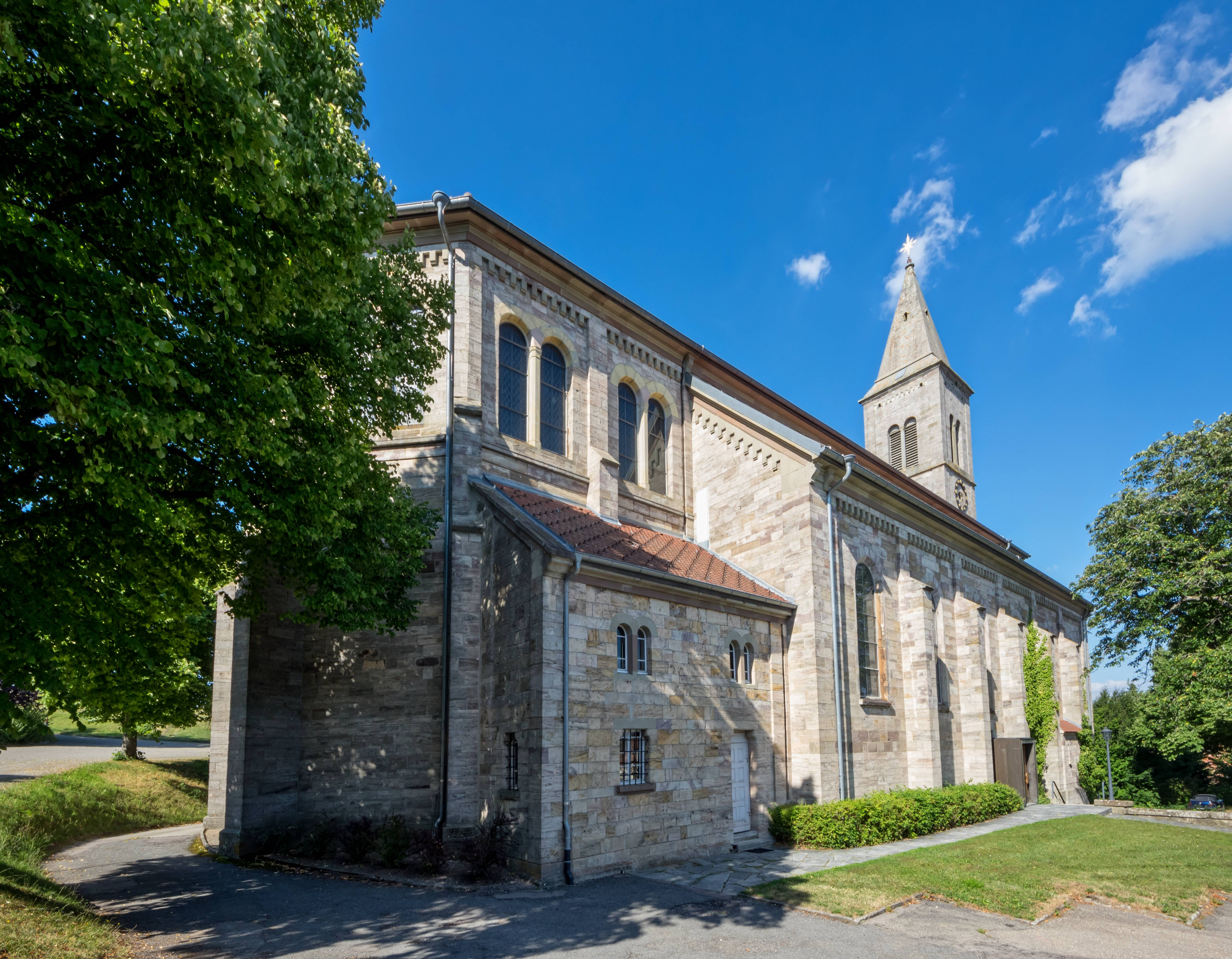
St. Peter and Paul from the southwest

Following the secularization of church properties in 1806, Bonndorf came under the Grand Duchy of Baden, and the Pauliner monastery ceased in 1807 after over 400 years. The monastery church reverted to a parish church, with maintenance responsibilities transferred to the Grand Duchy. Ecclesiastically, Bonndorf moved from the Diocese of Constance to the Archdiocese of Freiburg in 1821.

On the evening of July 18, 1842, a fire broke out in the church fund administrator's residence. Despite a calm night preventing the fire's spread, it destroyed seven private homes, including barns and stables, the rectory, and the former monastery church.

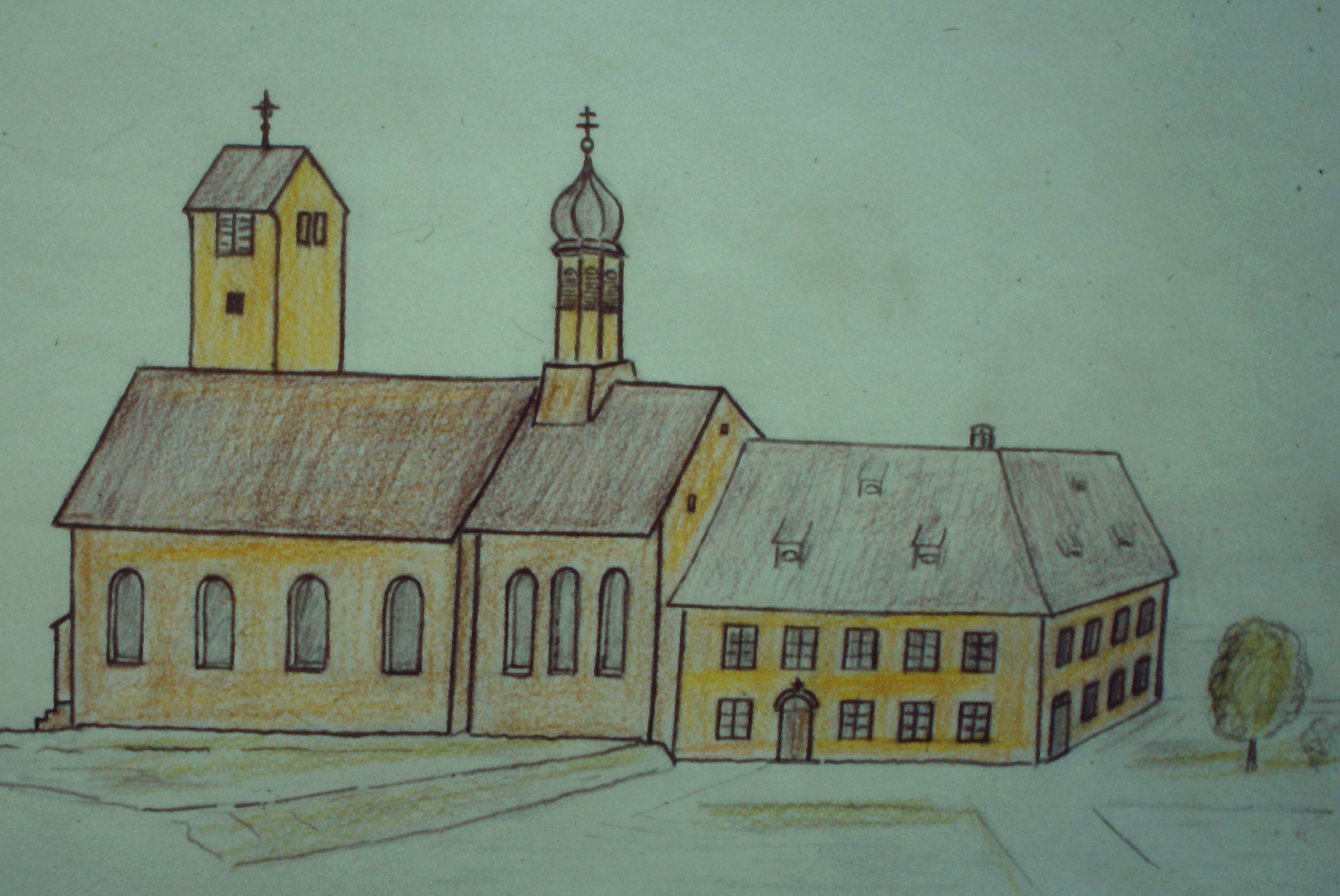
St. Peter and Paul Church with former Pauline monastery around 1815 (in the 20th (A painting of the 19th century from a drawing by Josef Köpfer, completed by the artist according to his own ideas)

== Construction history ==
After secularization, the Grand Duchy assumed responsibility for church construction. Around 1840, plans existed for a new parish church at the original site, but these were abandoned after the fire. Instead, Karlsruhe building inspector Friedrich Theodor Fischer drafted a new plan, approved in April 1844. The Donaueschingen district building office appointed Georg Steinwarz as the local construction supervisor. Following complaints from Bonndorf residents about Steinwarz and his assistant, and their request for an alternative supervisor, the Baden Court Domain Chamber removed the project from Donaueschingen's jurisdiction in May 1844, assigning it to Josef Berckmüller, a highly skilled pupil of Friedrich Weinbrenner. Berckmüller, then a private architect and trainee, reserved the right to revise Fischer's plans. His revised plans were submitted to the Catholic Church Council on July 17, 1844, and approved the same day. Having relocated from St. Blasien to Karlsruhe in 1844, Berckmüller was appointed district building master on December 19, 1844, and military building master in April 1845, while also handling police matters (e.g., building permits and neighbor disputes), effectively holding three roles simultaneously.

=== Site change and further delays ===
Initially, the church was planned for the site of the burned-down predecessor at coordinates 47.820403°N 8.34132°E However, by June 1845, Berckmüller deemed the site unsuitable after foundation work revealed unstable ground, as evidenced by cracks in the previous church. Heinrich Hübsch, Baden's chief building official and a stylistically influential church architect, along with fortress architects Georg Eberle and Major Mali, criticized the site, highlighting the need for costly stabilization measures.

Due to higher foundation costs, persistent risks, and potential delays, the Court Domain Chamber rejected the original site in early July 1845. Alternatives included a site at the cattle market square (47.819993, 8.346153) and the current location above the town (47.819485, 8.337422), behind Joseph Dobler's house. By August 1845, the latter was chosen, largely due to the unanimous preference of the Ebnet filial community for its proximity. Bonndorf residents favored the cattle market square for its central location.

Berckmüller likely adjusted his plans for the new site, with the cornerstone laid on May 7, 1846. Stones from the demolished monastery church ruins were used for the foundation, supplemented by sandstone from a quarry now part of the local sports field. Alongside site issues and slow funding, the Baden Revolution of 1848, with its “democratic turmoil” and “insurgent uprisings,” further delayed progress. In 1848, Franz Josef Bodenmüller from Engen arrived in Bonndorf, succeeding Joseph Gerspacher, who had served since 1838 after Joseph Anton Heizmann (1836) and Dominikus Kuenzer.

In December 1848, the parish complained to the Grand Ducal Domain Chamber about delays, despite the completion of the rough construction. Another complaint in January 1849 suggested work had stalled entirely. Progress resumed, with negotiations for bells and an organ in 1849, and Berckmüller designing the altar and baptismal font. The church was likely handed over on May 23, 1850, with work continuing until December 15. In 1850, Hieronymus Schuler from Engen was appointed parish priest from Frickingen, becoming the third priest involved in the rebuilding.

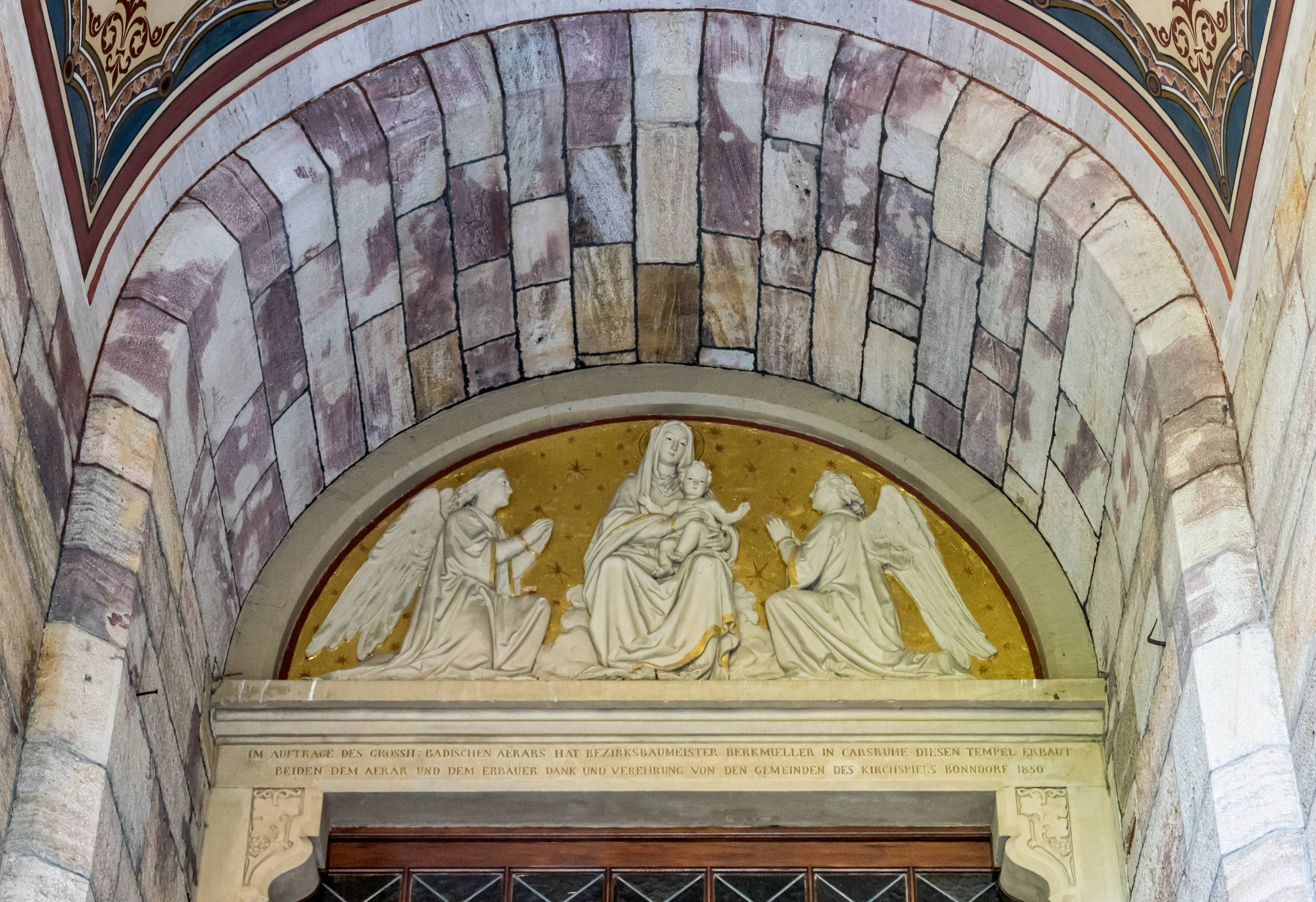
Mary with angels over the main entrance, by Franz Xaver Reich

=== Post-Construction complaints ===
Despite completion, the Baden Finance Ministry faced repeated complaints from Bonndorf about incomplete furnishings, including the absence of choir stalls, an altar rail, and a tabernacle, suggesting Berckmüller's altar design was never executed. In July 1858, the ministry assigned the interior completion to Heinrich Hübsch, Weinbrenner's successor since 1826 as head of the Karlsruhe Building School and the subsequent Karlsruhe Institute of Technology. Hübsch designed three new altars, with paintings by Amalie Bensinger completed by 1859. The main altar depicted Christ with the St. Peter and Paul, while the side altars featured Mary (left) and Joseph (right). The Donaueschingen district building office resumed oversight. Hübsch also commissioned Franz Xaver Reich from Hüfingen to create a terracotta Madonna with angels above the main entrance, with the altars and relief costing 2,422 guilder.

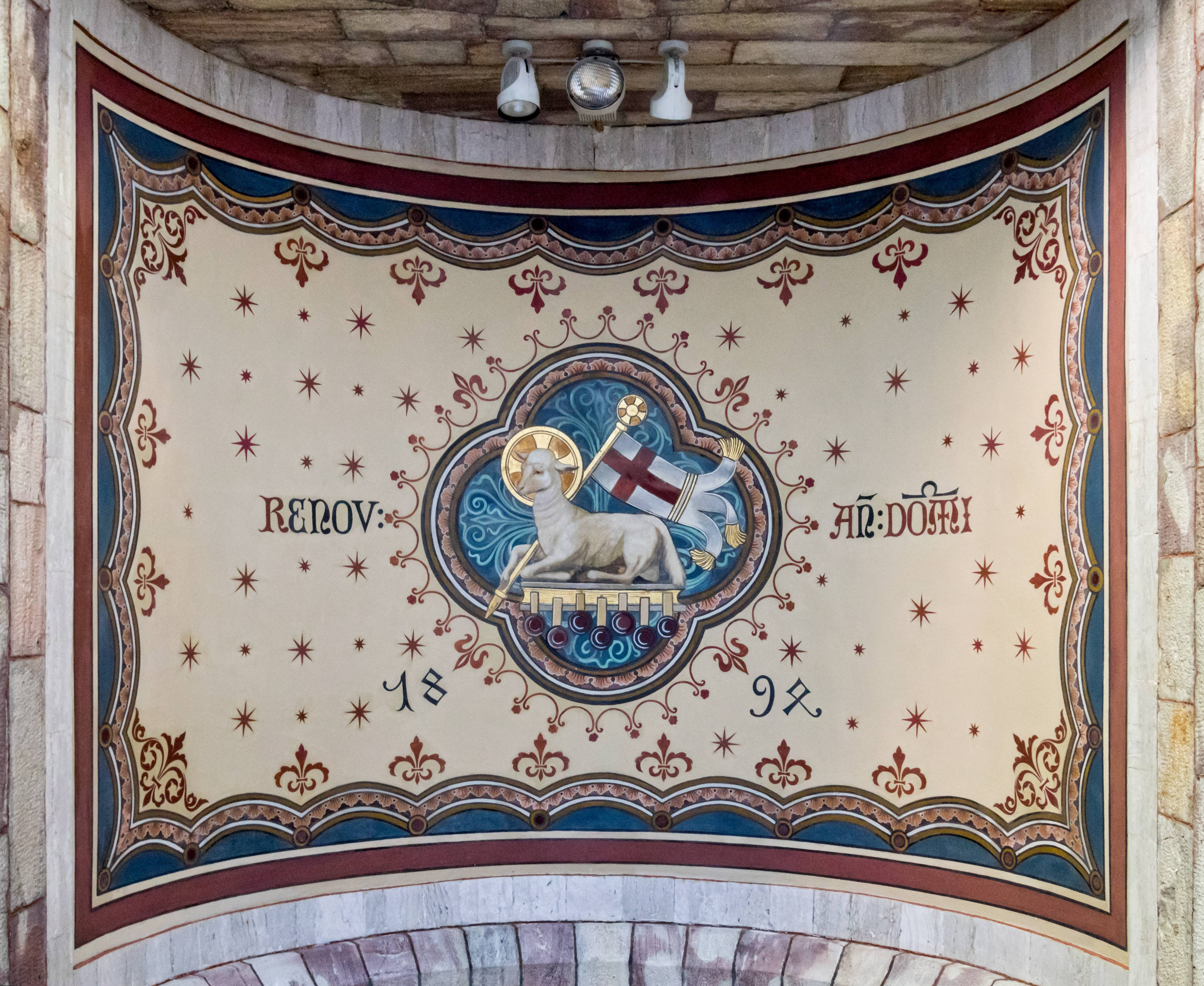
The Lamb of God, supposedly renovated in 1894

Unlike Reich's relief, the altars are no longer present. By the late 19th century, during the HIistoricism period, Berckmüller's and Hübsch's neoclassical forms were deemed austere. Parish priest Fridolin Honold (1837–1900) advocated for a new interior from 1886, reporting to the Baden Finance Ministry that he had raised 3,400 marks for a high altar costing 8,000 marks. He detailed desired paintings and statues, but the Grand Ducal Domain Directorate dismissed his descriptions as exaggerated, offering only funding for a new interior paint job. Honold threatened to escalate the matter to the Directorate, the Grand Duke, and State Minister Ludwig Turban. The church authorities, also approached, saw little chance of success and suggested private donations.

Between approximately 1893 and 1900, after Bonndorf received city privileges in 1891, the current interior was created, entirely funded by private donations. Franz Joseph Simmler (1846–1926), who operated a large workshop for ecclesiastical art in Offenburg, was responsible. Simmler had drafted designs for the Bonndorf choir in spring 1892. In May 1894, he predicted completion by late autumn, except for the nave wall paintings. The communion rail, choir stalls, and Marian altar were finished in 1896. An Agnus Dei depiction with the Book of Seven Seals and victory flag in the tower vestibule ceiling records a renovation in 1894. Simmler had recently completed similar work at Our Lady of Mount Carmel in Bräunlingen, continuing until 1897.

=== 20th century changes ===
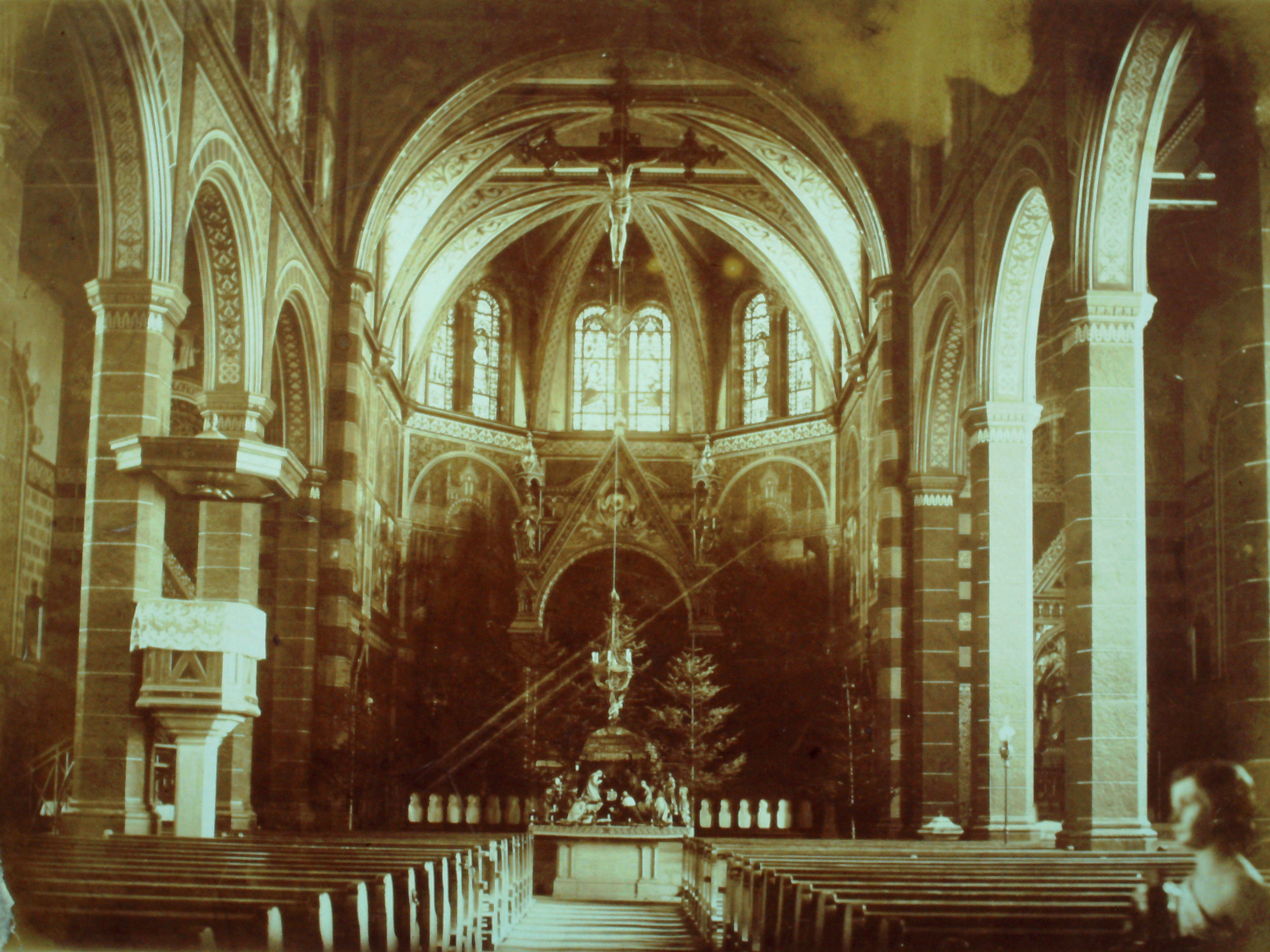
Christmas church at the time of the redesign by Simmler with objects that were later changed or removed: on the left the old pulpit, in the middle (behind a nativity scene) the communion rail, on the left above it the eternal light, on the right the passage to the right church door, which was later occupied with benches, as well as the old baptismal font

In 1902, a rectory was built north of the church in the same style, using stone from the same quarry as the church and an intervening prison. From 1907, the original pulpit was replaced with a larger one featuring four Church Fathers reliefs and a new sounding board, crafted by the Moroder brothers, who took over Simmler's workshop and completed a new baptismal font by 1911. After Bonndorf's electricity plant was approved in 1902 for 150,000 gold marks (approximately 1.2 million euros in 2025), a chandelier illuminated the nave.

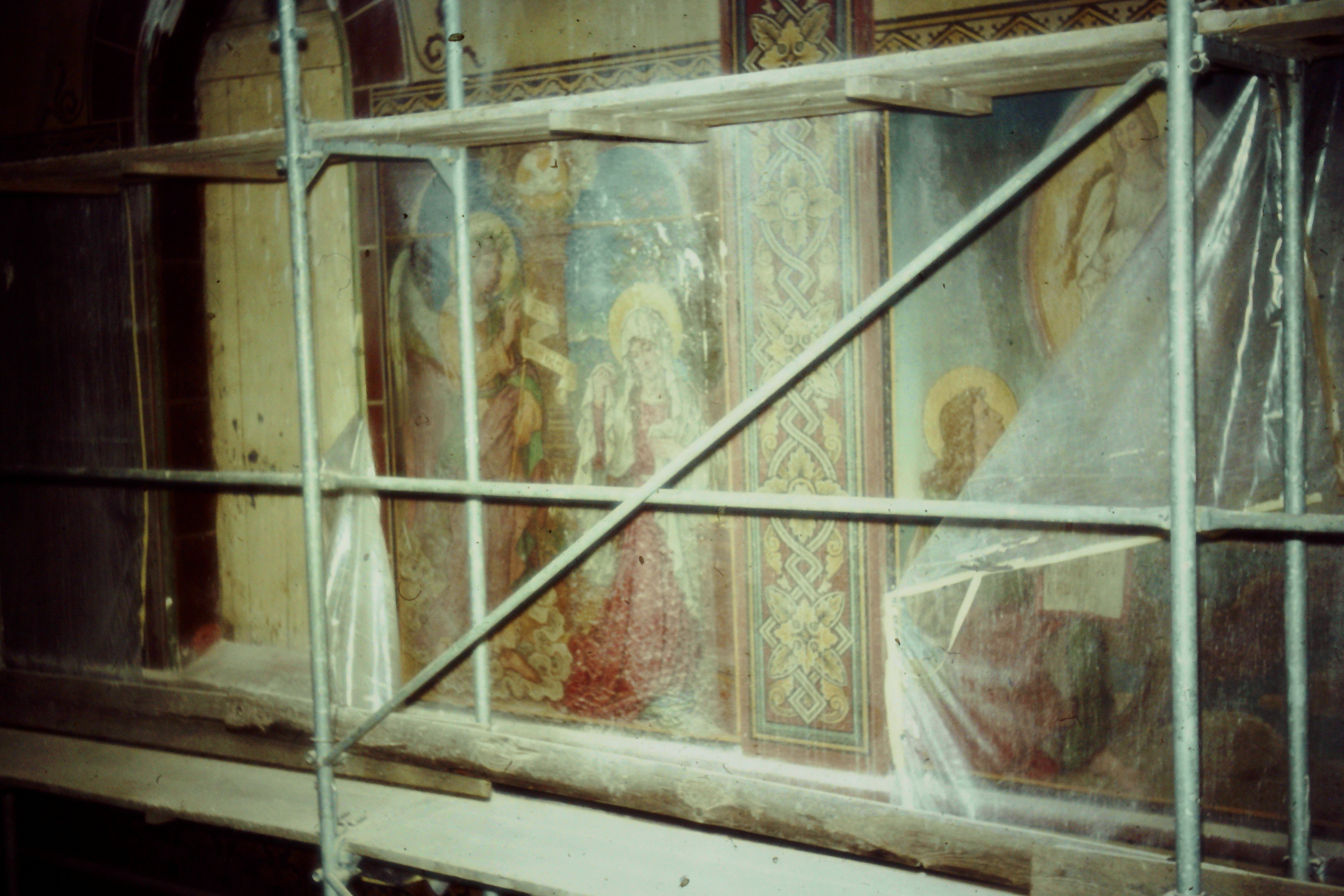
Restoration of the clerestory paintings in the 1970s

In 1919, the parish, represented by the Catholic Upper Foundation Council in Karlsruhe, sued the Baden Finance Ministry, arguing that post-secularization, the state was responsible for new needs, such as heating costs for the church and sacristy. After three legal instances, the Bonndorf Agreement of July 1927 mandated the state to cover 60% of such costs, setting a precedent applied to other churches previously managed by monasteries.

Before World War II, three confessionals were installed between buttresses in the outer walls, one replacing the right side door.

In the 1960s, the tower was renovated. Following the liturgical reforms of the Second Vatican Council in 1963, the unneeded column was moved closer to the altar, the soundboard removed to improve visibility. The communion rail, crafted by Simmler with the choir stalls, was relocated from the choir to the altar steps to accommodate a new trapezoidal celebratory altar. A steel-and-wood ambo with interchangeable fabric was added. The faded interior paintings were debated for repainting, with the state, responsible for maintenance, delaying a decision.

A comprehensive restoration from 1972 to 1974 replaced the blockwork painting with plain, light surfaces. New wooden furnishings, including a celebratory altar, ambo, choir stalls, and pews, were designed and installed, replacing outdated seating. The communion rail and pulpit were removed, with the pulpit's Church Fathers reliefs relocated to the nearby Paulinerheim community center. During renovations, the evangelical community lent their Pauluskirche, allowing Catholics to return in a procession to their restored church. About 100 years earlier, the evangelical diaspora community had moved into Bonndorf's castle chapel, remaining until 1954 when they relocated to their newly built Pauluskirche under the ringing of St. Peter and Paul's bells.

=== 21st Century ===
The roof was re-tiled in 1999. A heating system upgrade was planned for 2014, with the type undecided. By December 2015, Solarcomplex AG connected the church to Bonndorf's second district heating network, replacing the oil boiler with a heat exchanger while retaining the warm air heating system.

== Architecture ==
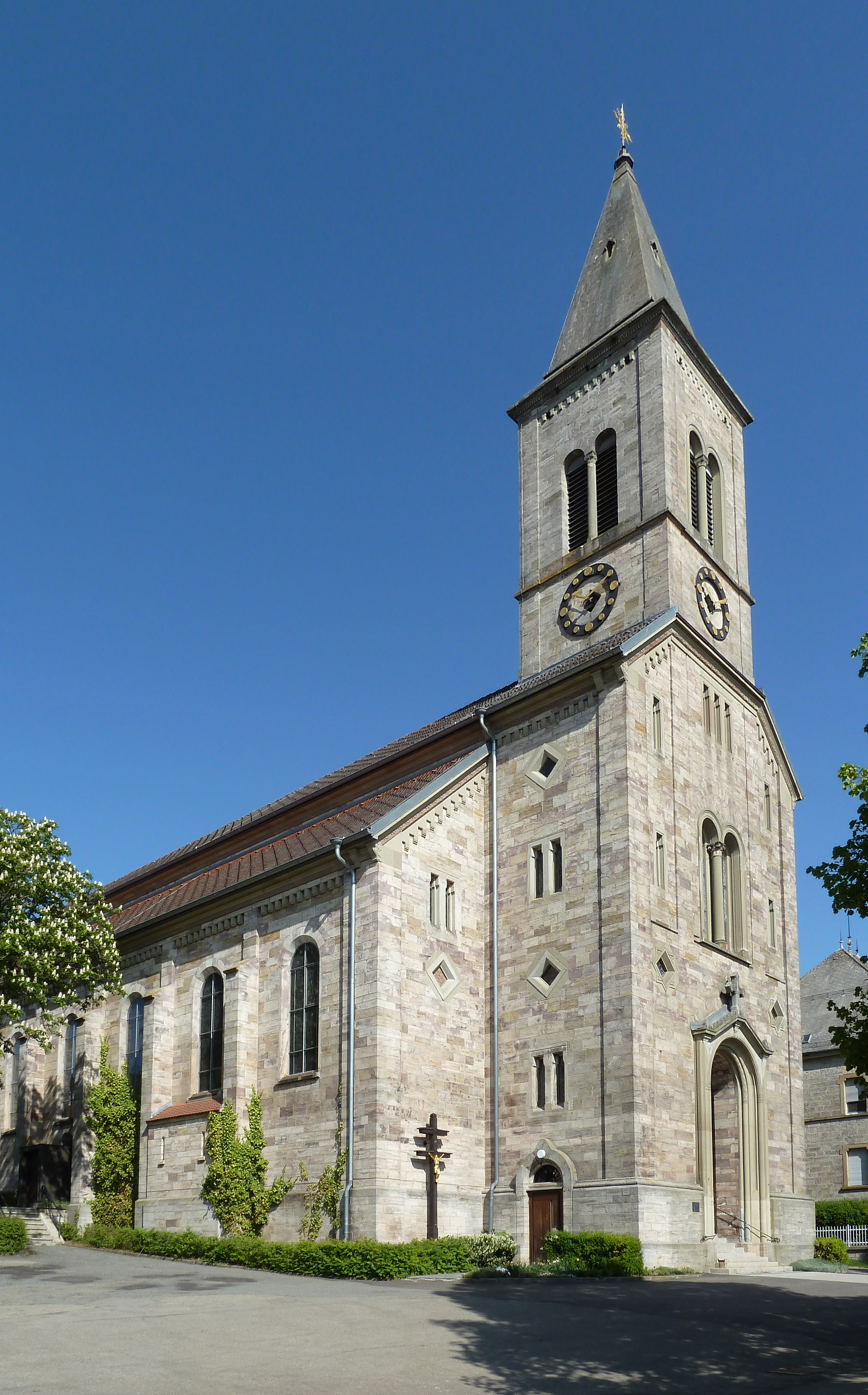
Facade tower and nave

A grand staircase leads to the façade of the west-facing church, situated on a hill above the town. The façade tower comprises a lower block and a square tower with two open stories, topped by a steep pyramidal spire. Above the rounded portal, the façade, framed by pilasters, features a paired round-arched window with a central column, flanked by tall rectangular windows. The lower block's side sections are covered by the extended nave roof's slopes, supported by a crenelated cornice extending horizontally across the façade. Plans from August 1846 in the Karlsruhe General State Archives show the vestibule with differently arranged round-arched windows and a balcony below the clock. A stone staircase beneath the portal leads to the tower's base and a double-leaf coffered door, forming the main entrance, which accesses the three-nave pseudobasilica via a vestibule and glass door. The nave connects to the façade tower, with simple buttresses marking the bays, illuminated by round-arched windows cut into the walls without profiles. Crenelated cornices surround the side aisles’ pent roofs and the three-sided apse with sacristy extensions. The nave roof is elevated only by an eaves cornice above the side roofs. The exterior is characterized by the precise and elegant cut of visible sandstone, popular in the mid-19th century.

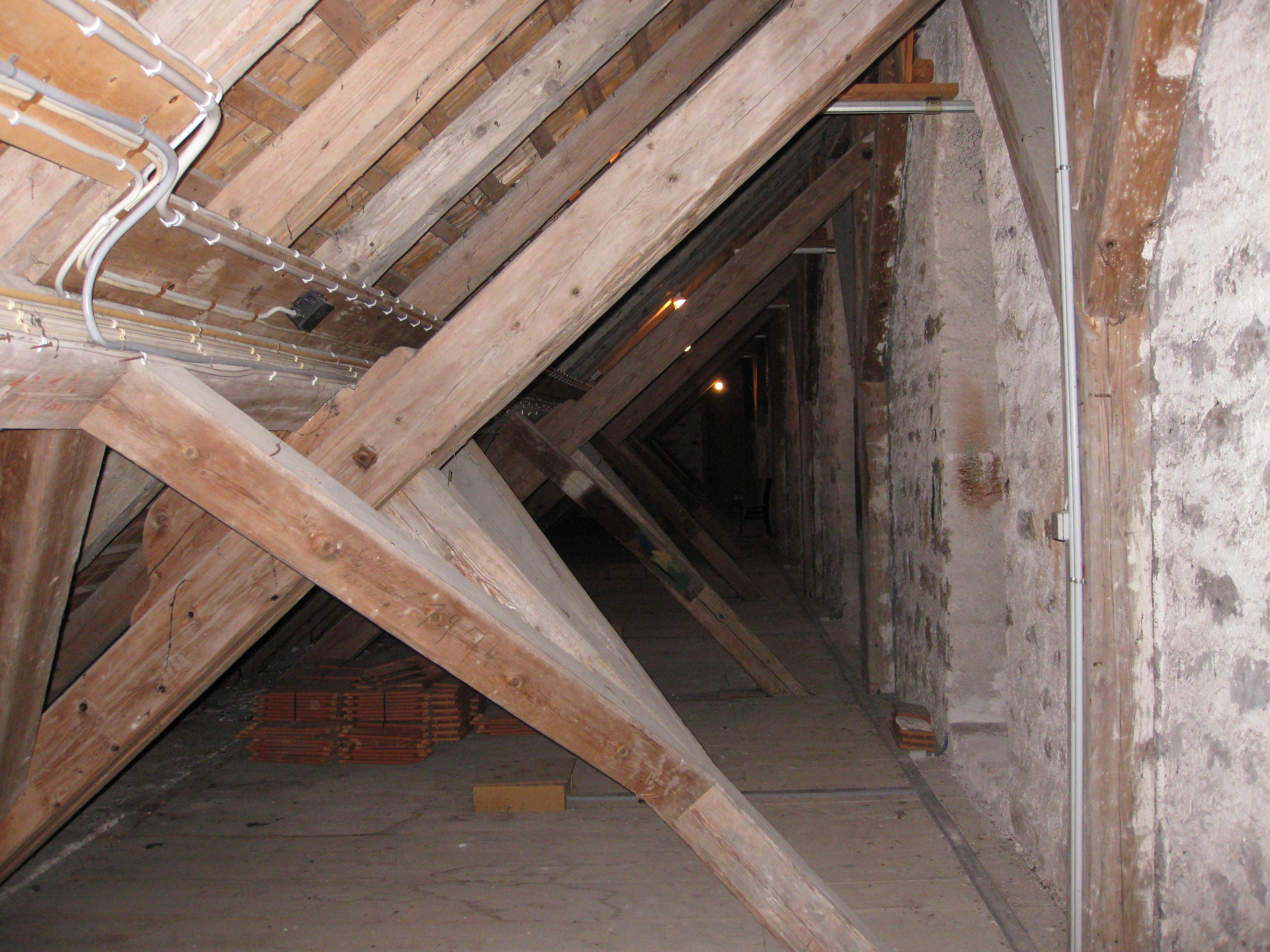
Cleretary window opening below the side aisle roof

The nave and side aisles are flat-ceiled, separated by round-arched arcades on square-section pillars with chamfered corners. Despite its pseudobasilica design, the church has six clerestory-like openings above a cornice on the high nave walls, covered by higher side aisle roofs and boarded up since 1849. These round-arched niches, framed by pilasters, are unusual for a pseudobasilica. Both Honold, Simmler, and Hans Jakob and Judith Wörner (1975) assumed Berckmüller planned a true basilica with fenestrated nave walls, altered without his input, similar to the Alexanderkirche in Marbach am Neckar. Joseph Sauer suggested the change was partly for structural reasons, with steeper side aisle roofs benefiting the snowy Black Forest winters. Simmler proposed adding skylights to the side aisle roofs to open the clerestory windows. However, Elisabeth Spitzbart disproved this, finding Berckmüller's 1846–1849 plans in Karlsruhe, showing he oversaw the project meticulously, with closed high nave walls in earlier designs. The purpose of the blind clerestory windows, possibly intended for apostle figures per an 1858 Finance Ministry note, was soon forgotten.

A round-arched chancel arch leads to the choir, covered by a simplified cross-ribbed vault. The choir's lower window row, planned larger, was executed with smaller cross-shaped windows, later walled up for painting space per Simmler's 1892 suggestion, though their outlines remain visible externally. Two windows, opening to the southern sacristy's attic, suggest a post-Berckmüller, pre-Simmler extension.

The church measures 38 meters long, 18.25 meters wide, and 14.5 meters high, with 400 seats and 200 standing places.

== Interior Furnishings ==
Franz Simmler's paintings dominate the interior, their deep, rich tones hard to discern due to the lack of clerestory windows. Non-figural areas feature ornaments, Gothicizing vines, palmettes, meanders, and round arches. The ceiling, with heavy crossbeams and finer longitudinal slats, is ornamentally painted in the nave and side aisles.

=== Choir ===
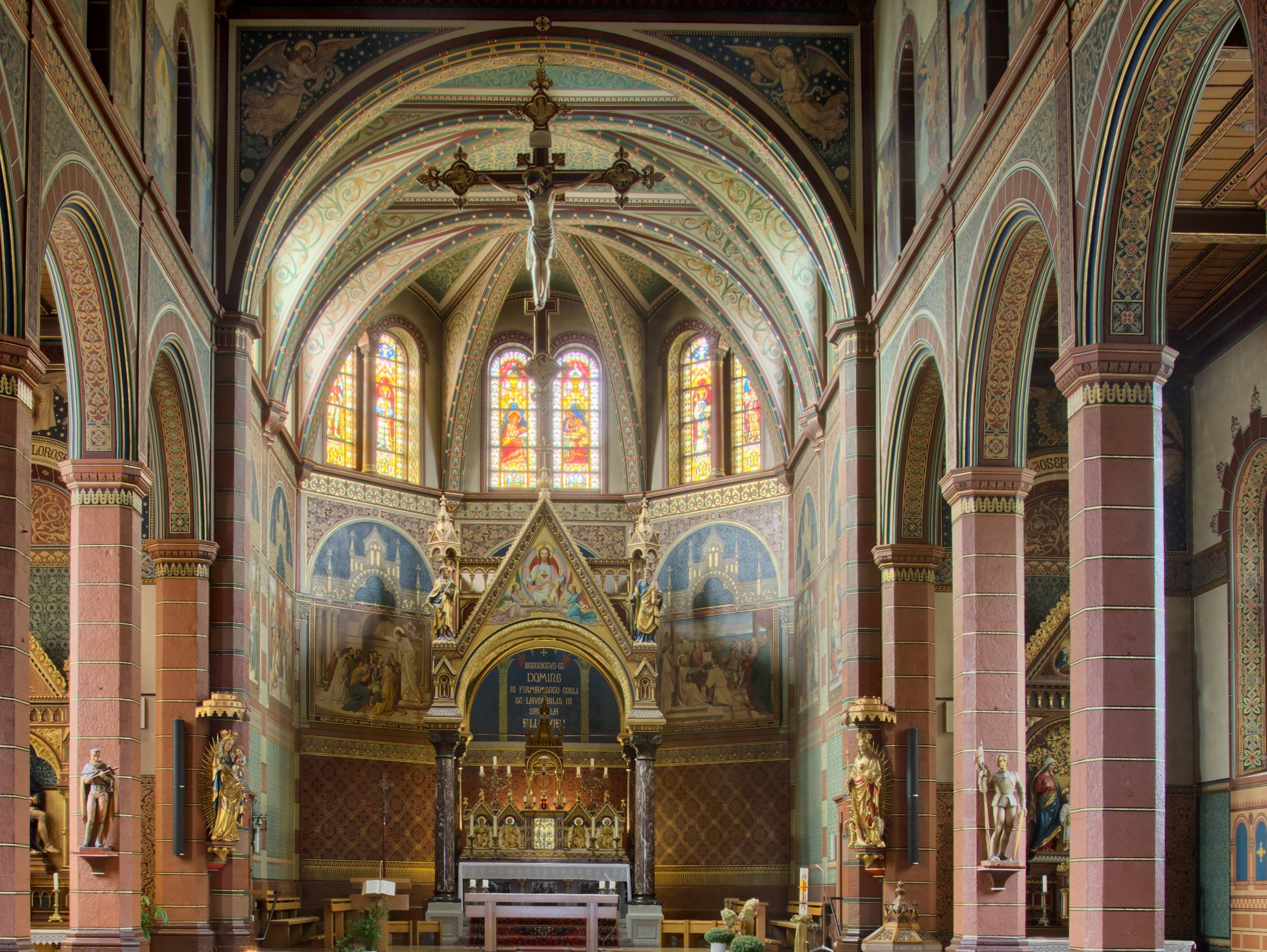
Choir

At the choir entrance, painted wooden figures stand: on the left, Mary with Child, donated by Bernhard Morath in 1935; on the right, Christ the King.

A triumphal cross from the late 19th century, blending Romanesque and Gothic styles, hangs in the chancel arch. Christ is depicted as a king with a halo, flanked by angels holding a scepter, orb, and crown, with evangelist symbols at the cross ends. Yet, he wears a crown of thorns as a suffering figure, typical of Gothic art.

The choir has seven paired windows, three central ones with figural designs: an Emmaus scene behind the high altar, Bernhard of Baden and Emperor Henry II to the left, and King Louis IX and John the Baptist to the right. The outer four have ornamental borders, per Simmler's 1892 recommendation for choir-only stained glass using cathedral glass. These were crafted by Helmle & Merzweiler in Freiburg in 1894.

The choir vault's keystone bears Pope Leo XIII's coat of arms, reflecting his 1878–1903 tenure during Simmler's decoration.

==== High Altar ====
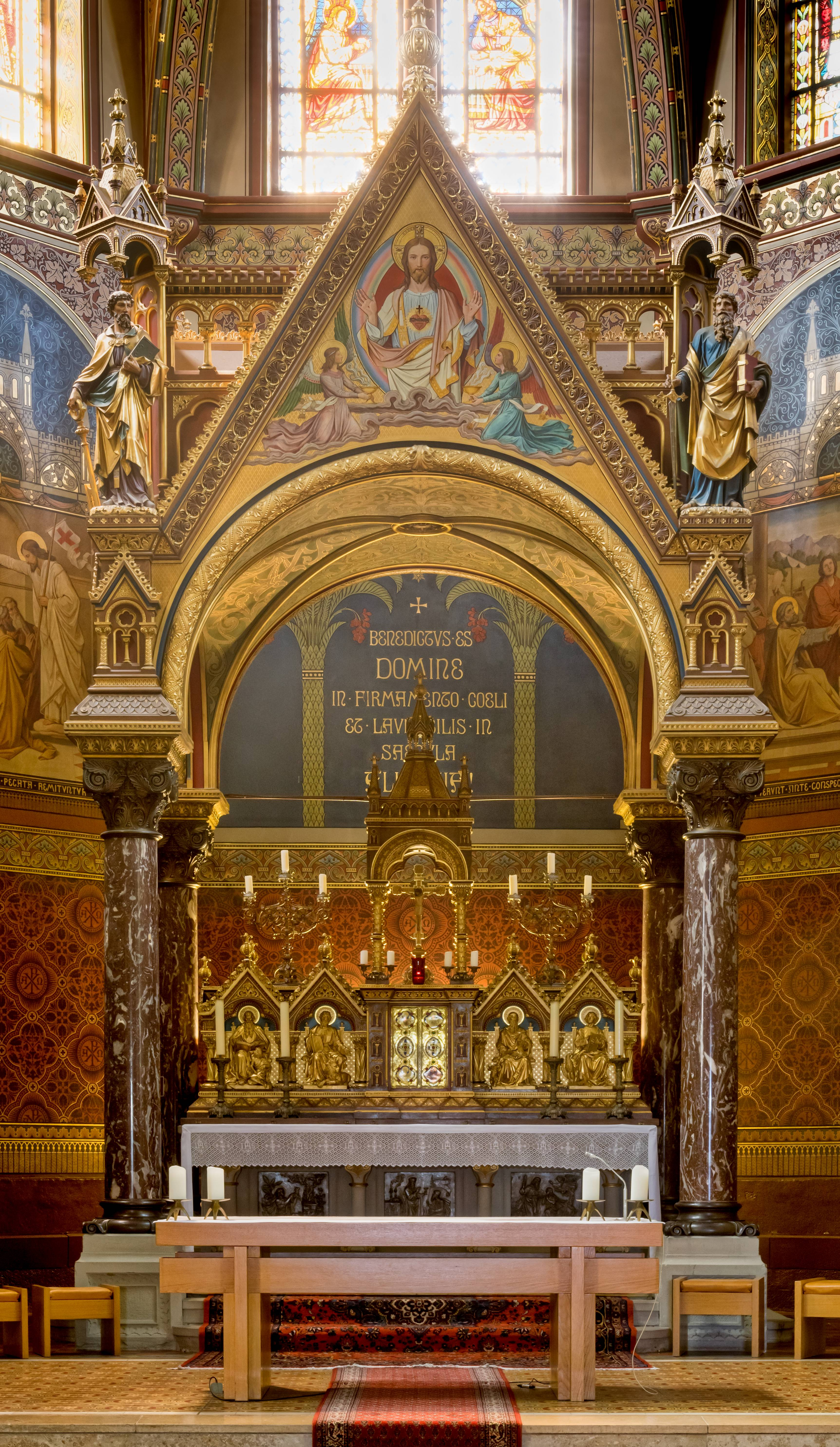
High altar

Consecrated in 1896, the high altar features four polished red fossil-rich limestone columns with Byzantine-style bronze capitals around the altar table and gilded bronze tabernacle. Simmler described the columns as red marble, a common industry term, though geologically inaccurate. The antependium has three bronze panels depicting Old Testament sacrifices: Abel with a lamb, Melchizedek with bread and wine, and Abraham's intended sacrifice of Isaac. The tabernacle is flanked by evangelist reliefs. The columns support a ciborium baldachin with a wimperg, its gold-background front showing a Sacred Heart depiction in a mandorla with angels holding censers. Left and right are Thomas Aquinas with a book referencing his hymn Tantum ergo and St. Barbara with a chalice, host, crown, and martyr's palm. The church patrons, Peter and Paul, stand under individual baldachins on either side.

To offset column costs, Simmler simplified the stone mensa and rear baldachin gable, using galvanoplastic capitals and stone steps instead of cast bronze capitals and polished granite steps, which would have cost 6,000 marks (approximately 48,000 euros in 2025). Simmler & Venator and Max Meckel later reused the Bonndorf altar design for other churches, with Simmler calling it “very rich” and hoping it would be the finest ciborium altar.

The eternal light’s oil lamp, made by Simmler & Venator, lost its bracket during the 1970s renovation and stood on the tabernacle until restored and rehung centrally in the choir in 2024.

==== Wall Paintings ====
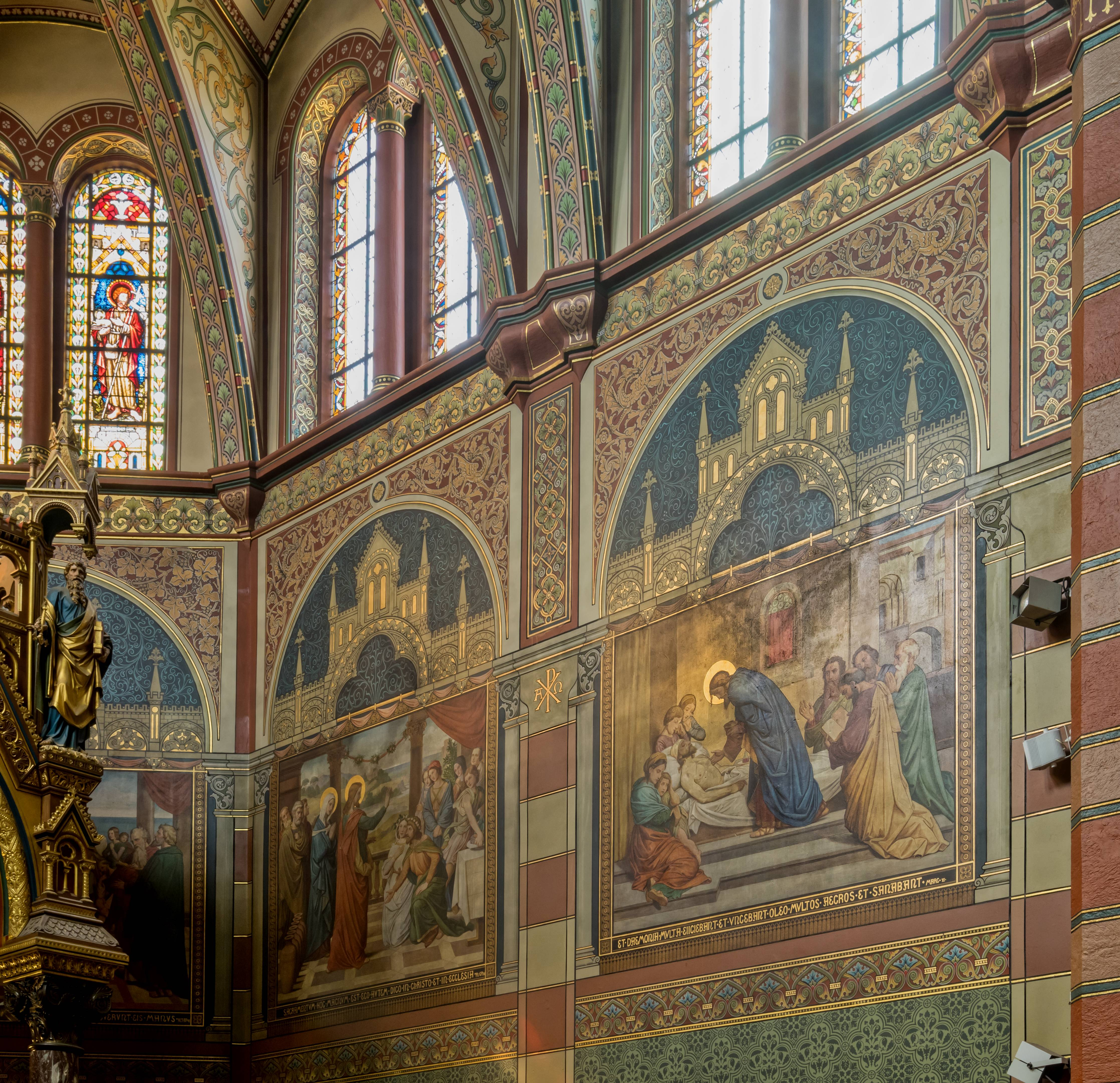
Sacramental scenes to the right altar: Marriage and Anointing of the Stick

The choir walls depict six of the seven sacraments: baptism, confirmation, and confession on the left; holy orders, marriage, and anointing of the sick on the right, with biblical references (Mt 28:19, Acts 8:17, Jn 20:22–23, Acts 6:6, Eph 5:31–32, Mk 6:13). Simmler wrote to Honold, citing motifs from Friedrich Overbeck’s tapestry cycle for Orvieto Cathedral, using woodcut editions by August Gaber. Each painting, on a lapis lazuli blue background, is topped by a Byzantine baldachin. Overbeck’s Old Testament prefigurations were not executed. The Eucharist, the seventh sacrament, is represented by the ciborium altar, with the Emmaus scene in the window above and a Bible verse from the Trinity Sunday Gradual (Dan 3:56) on the choir wall.

=== Nave ===
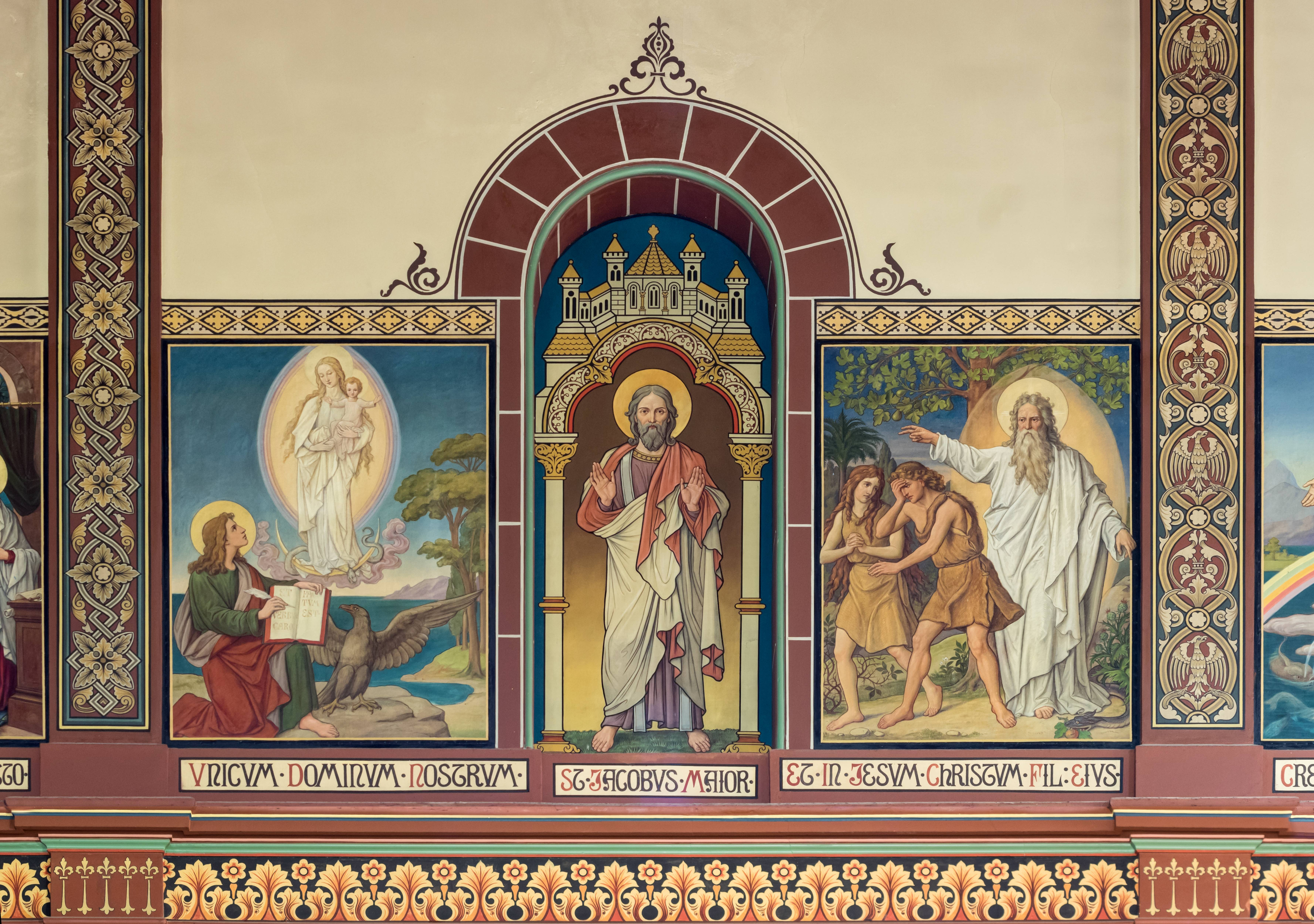
Detail from the frieze in the clerestory

The baptismal font, between the chancel arch’s right end and the right side altar, has a wooden cover inscribed with Mt 28:19. A corner of the base reads “LARCHI 22.9.11.”

==== Clerestory Paintings ====
A pictorial frieze spans the high nave walls’ round-arched niches, depicting apostles in eight inner niches (excluding Peter and Paul, shown on the high altar) and the four evangelists at the corners with their symbols: Matthew (winged man), Mark (lion), Luke (ox), and John (eagle).

Below each figure, their names interrupt one of the twelve statements of the Apostolic Creed. The creed begins with "CREDO IN DEVM PATREM OMNIPOTENTEM" at the chancel arch (left), continues along the south wall to "DEI PATRIS OMNIPOTENTIS" at the organ loft, resumes on the north wall with "INDE VENTVRVS EST IVDICARE" at the organ loft, and concludes at the chancel arch (right) with "AMEN". Above, Simmler illustrated the text with tall rectangular biblical scenes flanking the niches. No scenes appear above "DEI PATRIS OMNIPOTENTIS" and "INDE VENTVRVS EST IVDICARE" at the nave walls' ends, as these inscriptions run parallel to the organ casing, which would obstruct the view.

Honold and Simmler vividly grounded the Creed biblically, assigning its parts to both apostles and evangelists, distinct from an Apostles' Creed.

Picture	Motif	Inscription	Translation	Apostle/Evangelist
	God creates the stars	CREDO IN DEVM PATREM OMNIPOTENTEM	I believe in God, the Father Almighty,	Matthew
	God creates living beings	CREATOREM COELI ET TERRAE	Creator of heaven and earth.	Matthew
	God expels Adam and Eve from Eden (Gen 3:23)	ET IN JESVM CHRISTVM FILIVM EIVS	And in Jesus Christ, His only Son,	James the Great
	John on Patmos, referencing Jn 1:14	VNICVM DOMINVM NOSTRVM	our Lord,	James the Great
	Annunciation	QVI CONCEPTVS EST DE SPIRITV SANCTO	conceived by the Holy Spirit,	Philip
	Birth of Jesus	NATVS EX MARIA VIRGINE	born of the Virgin Mary	Philip
	Crucifixion	PASSVS SVB PONTIO PILATO CRVCIFIXVS	suffered under Pontius Pilate, crucified,	Bartholomew
	Entombment of Christ	MORTVVS ET SEPVLTVS	died, and was buried,	Bartholomew
	Christ's descent to the underworld	DESCENDIT AD INFEROS TERTIA DIE	descended into hell, on the third day	Simon
	Mary Magdalene at the empty tomb (Noli me tangere)	RESVRREXIT A MORTVIS	risen from the dead,	Simon
	Jesus in a mandorla with angels	ASCENDIT AD COELOS SEDET AD DEXTERAM	ascended into heaven, seated at the right hand	Mark
Organ pipe casing		DEI PATRIS OMNIPOTENTIS	of God, the Father Almighty	Mark
Organ pipe casing		INDE VENTVRVS EST IVDICARE	from there He wil come to judge	Luke
	Jesus with the Father and Holy Spirit	VIVOS ET MORTVOS	the living and the dead.	Luke
	Christ as judge with Mary and John the Baptist	CREDO IN	I believe in	Jude Thaddeus
	Descent of the Holy Spirit	SPIRITVM SANCTVM	the Holy Spirit,	Jude Thaddeus
	Peter and John invoking the Spirit in Samaria (Acts 8:17)	SANCTAM ECCLESIAM CATHOLICAM	the Holy Catholic Church,	James the Less
	Militant, suffering, and triumphant Church	SANCTORVM COMMVNIONEM	the communion of saints,	James the Less
	Christ exorcising demons	REMISSIONEM	forgiveness	Thomas
	Keys given to Peter (Mt 16:19)	PECCATORVM	of sins,	Thomas
	At the resurrection of the dead Michael separating the good from evil	CARNIS	of the body,	Andrew
	Angel marking the righteous (Rev 7)	RESVRRECTIONEM	resurrection	Andrew
	Angel driving the damned to hell	VITAM AETERNAM	and eternal life.	John
	Angel leading the blessed to paradise	AMEN	Amen	John

==== Statues ====
Painted wooden statues of individuals and groups line the nave pillars. On the right side (facing the altar), the sequence begins after the entrance with Brother Conrad, offering bread to a boy and a girl. Next is Saint Joseph, holding an axe as his attribute. At the following pillar stands Anthony of Padua with the Child Jesus in his arms, and at the last, Blessed Bernhard of Baden with a flag and a shield bearing the Baden coat of arms. On the left side, starting at the entrance, is Jude Thaddeus, holding a club and a medallion with Jesus’ image, linked to the Abgar legend. Beside him, a man and a woman kneel with folded hands, seeking his aid, as Thaddeus is known as a helper in difficult situations. Next is Saint Walpurga, with an abbess's staff in her right hand and a book and oil flask in her left. Following her is Saint Therese of the Child Jesus, depicted with roses and a cross, and finally Saint Aloysius with a cross and sword.

=== Side altars ===
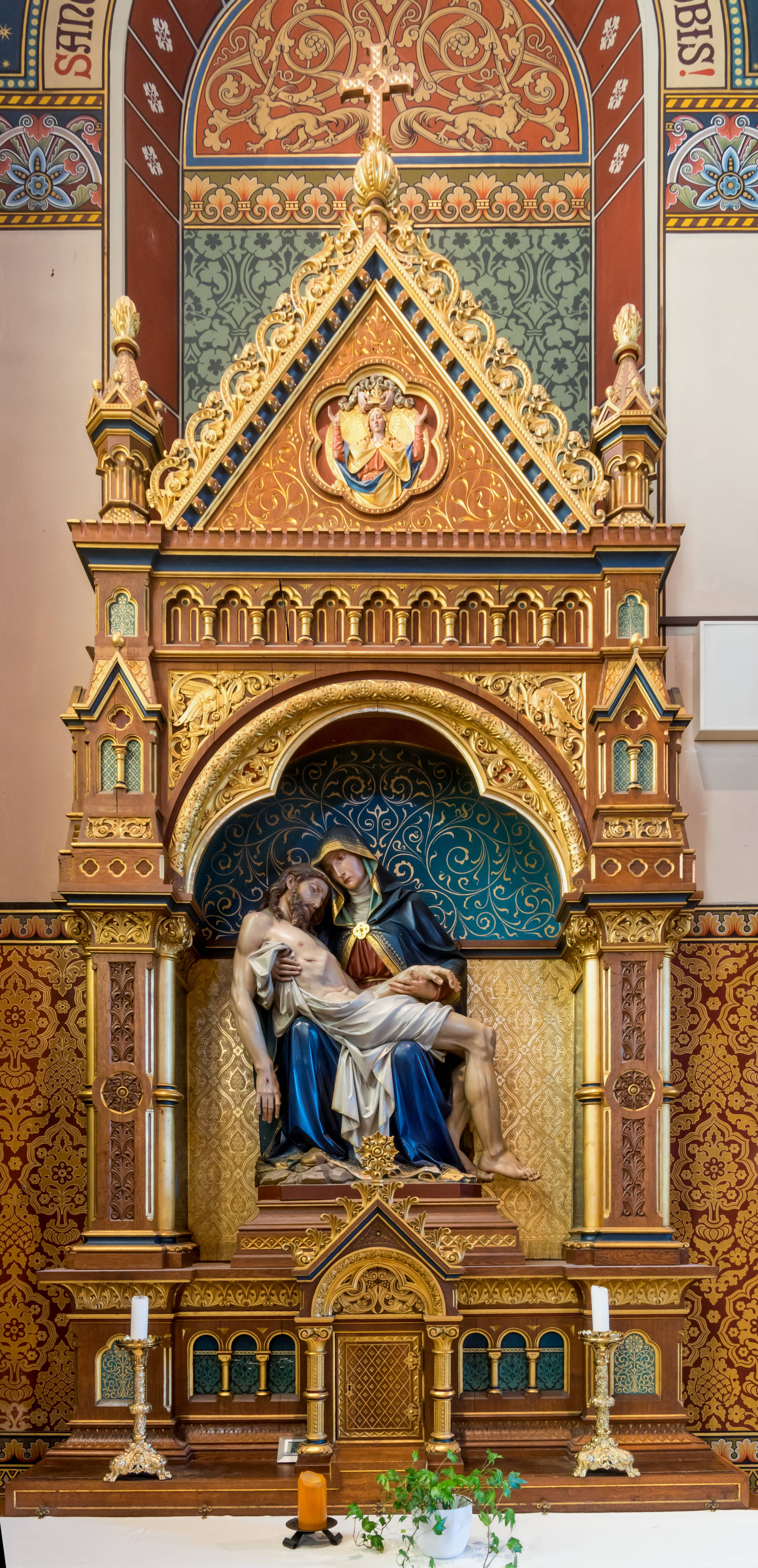
The two altars

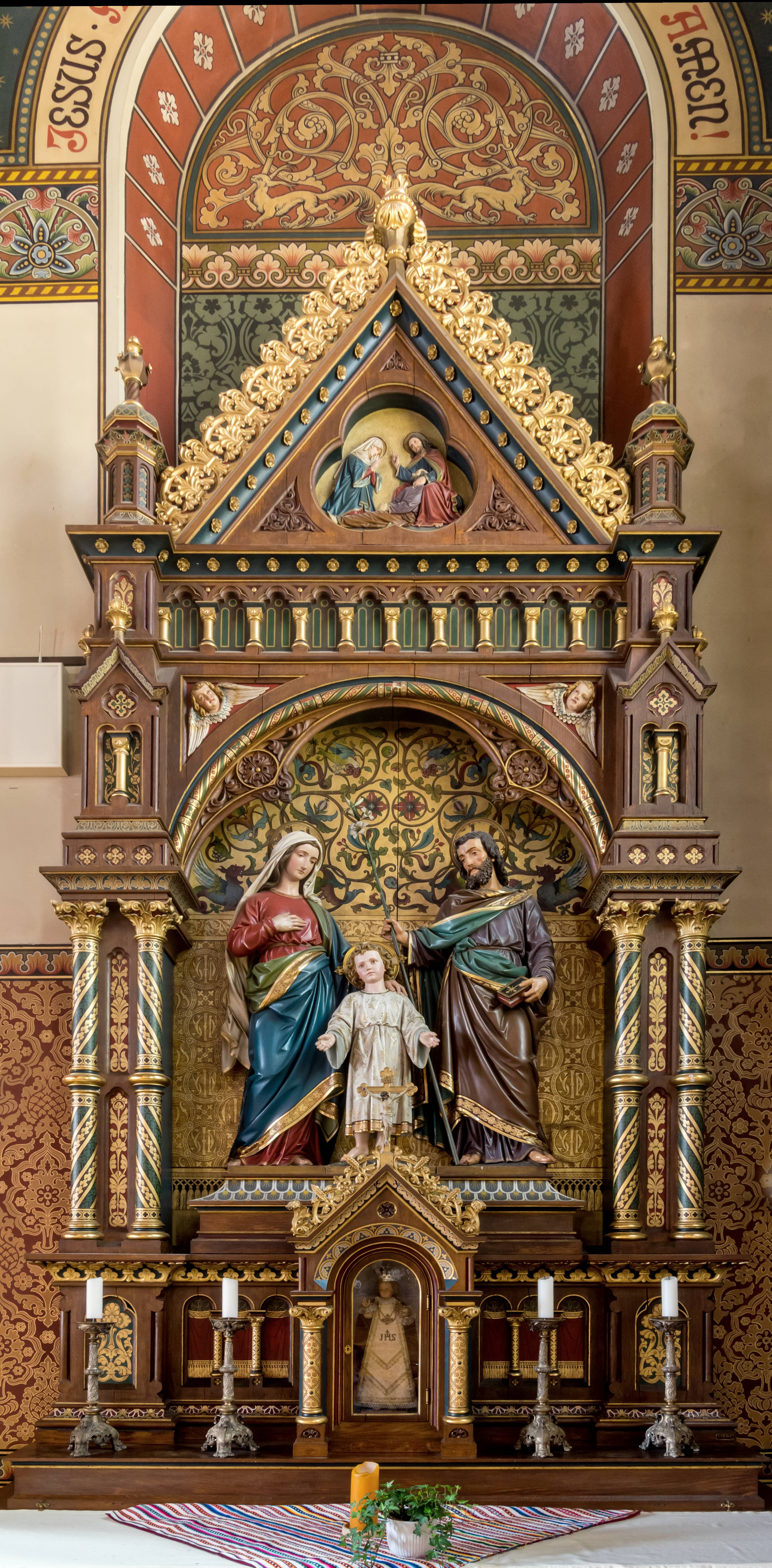

Both side altars follow the same design: columns reminiscent of early Gothic support the altar table, above which rises "a massive structure in the form of a late Romanesque-Byzantine wimperg-aedicula, supported on both sides by a triple group of columns. Behind the altars are round-arched niches, each crowned by an inscribed band. Including the paintings above the bands, the altars extend to the ceiling.

The left side altar centers on a Pietà sculpture. In the altarpiece, a relief depicts Mary as a half-figure with raised arms, with two hands holding a crown above her head. The band’s inscription reads, "SANCTA MATER DOLOROSA ORA PRO NOBIS!" (Our Lady of Sorrows, pray for us!). Above the altar, angels hold Veronica's veil. A nave window notes that the altar was donated by Amalia Glunk in 1895.

The right side altar's main sculpture portrays the Holy Family in a Holy Kinship depiction. The altarpiece relief shows Mary and Jesus blessing the dying Joseph, his foster father. The band refers to the Holy Family: "JESUS MARIA ET JOSEPH SALVATE NOS AMEN" (Jesus, Mary, and Joseph, save us. Amen). Angels above carry a lily wreath with the IHS monogram. A plaque credits sculptor Josef Eberle from Überlingen, with the year 1894 and donor F. Werner noted in a nave window

==== Wall paintings ====
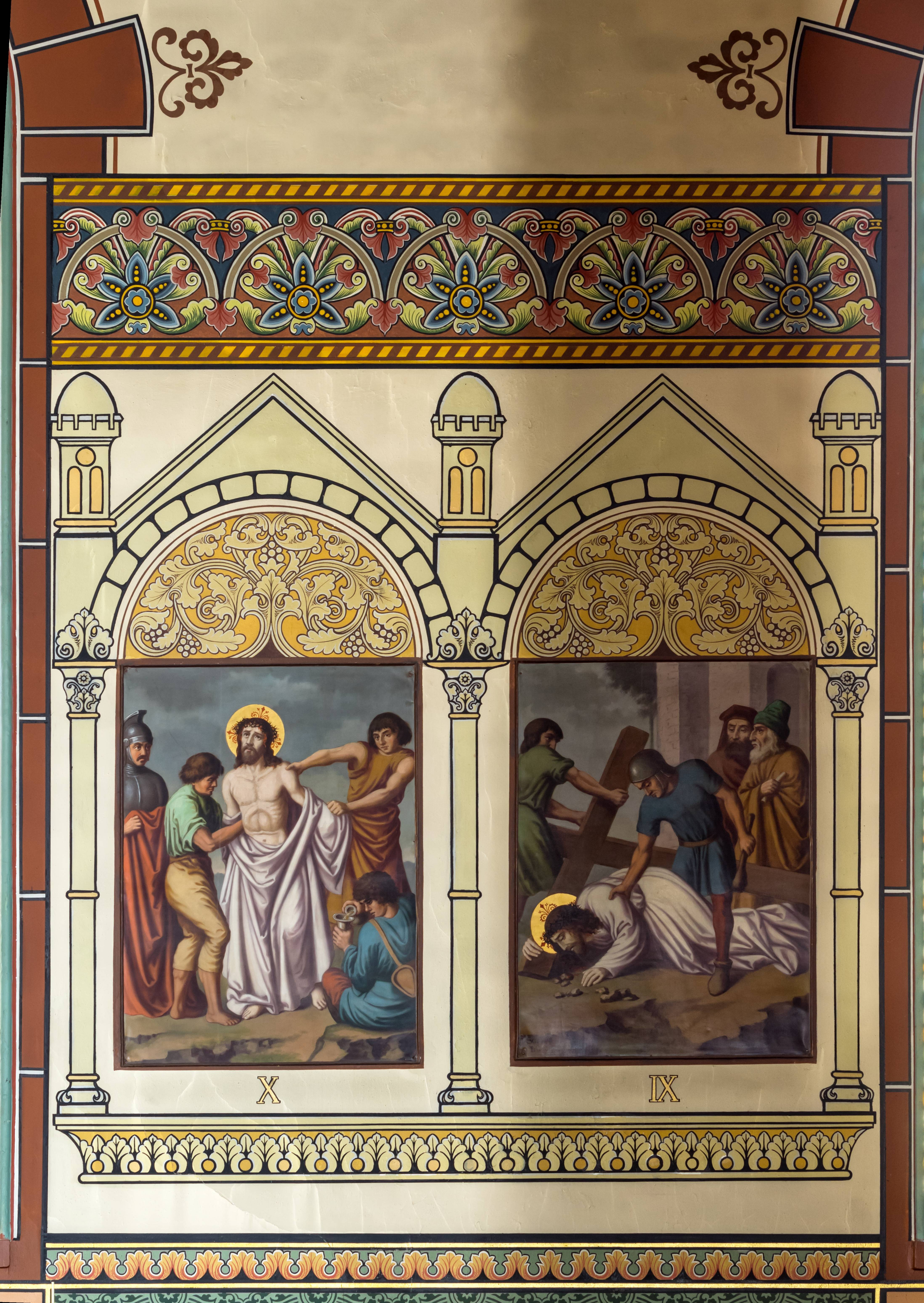
Stations of the Cross: Jesus is stripped of his clothes (X) and Jesus falls for the third time under the cross (IX)

Between the side aisle windows, a series of Stations of the Cross by Simmler adorns the walls. Each station is crowned by a tympanum in a wimperg. Starting left of the choir and side altar, they follow the same reading direction as the Creed frieze. After three pairs between windows, a single station appears before the penultimate window on each side, accommodating all 14 stations.

==== Windows ====
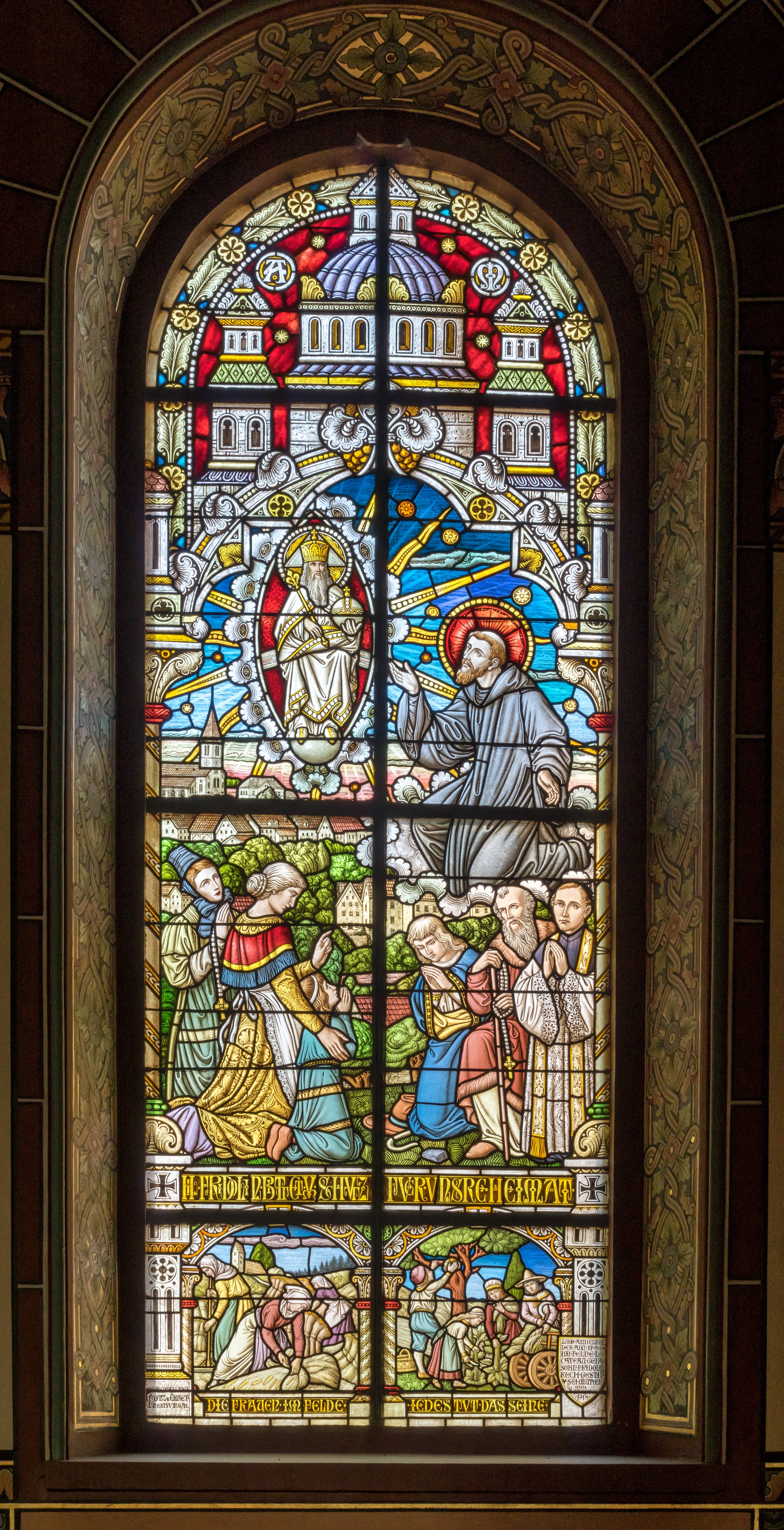
Believers ask Saint Fridolin for intercession with God to protect their homeland, Bonndorf (1918)

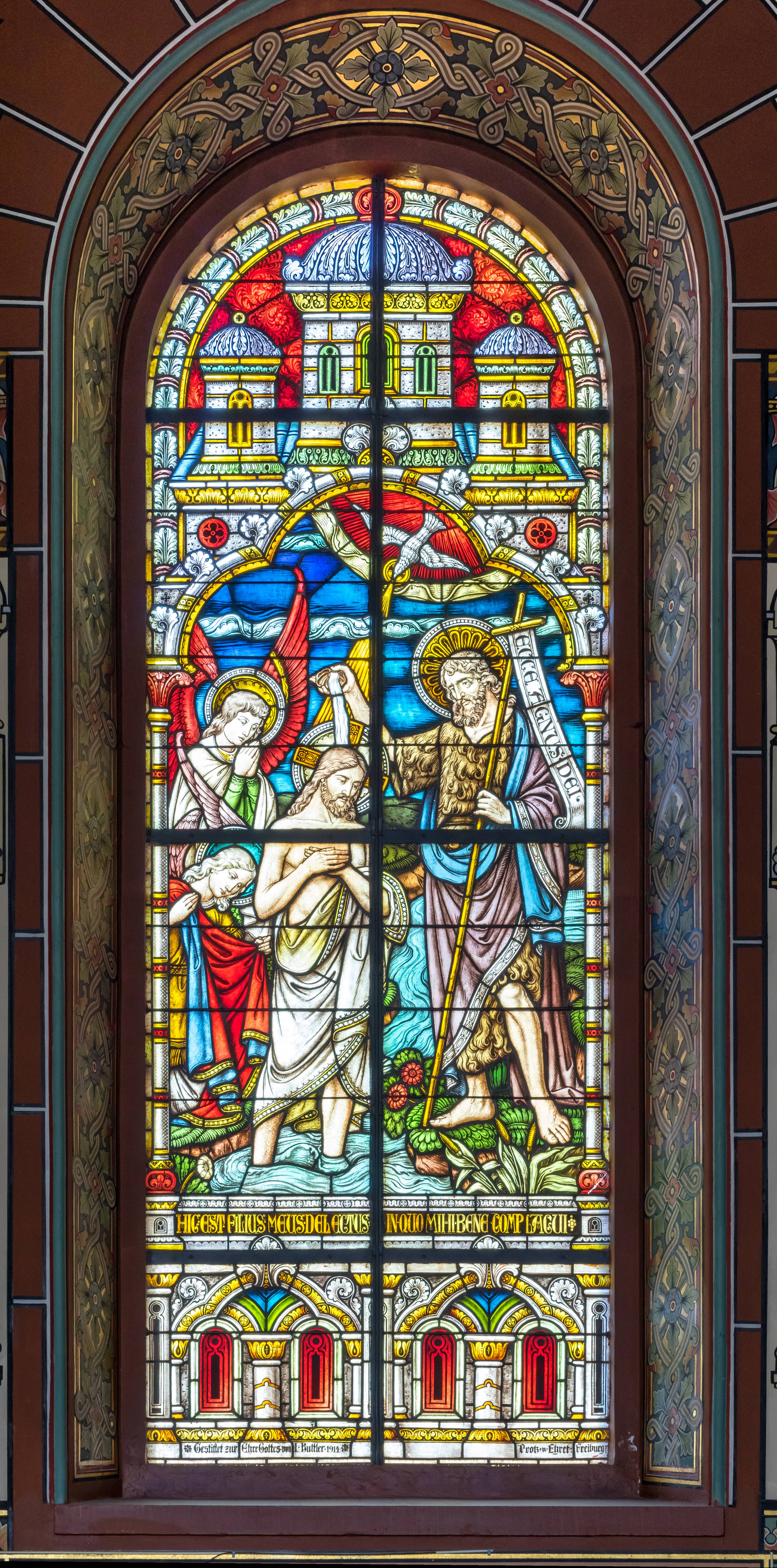
Baptism of Jesus in the Jordan by John the Baptist

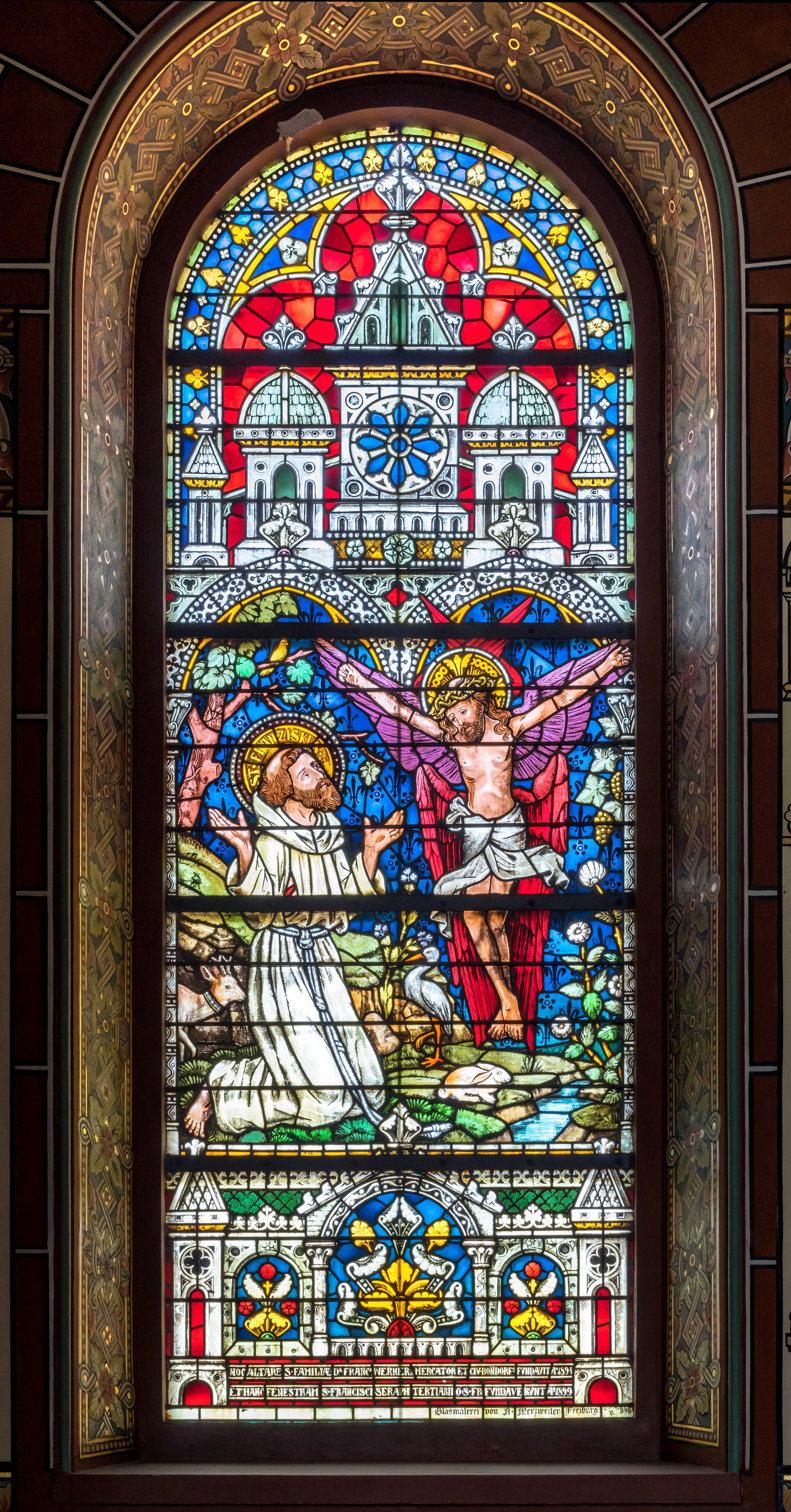
Francis receiving the stigmata (1899)

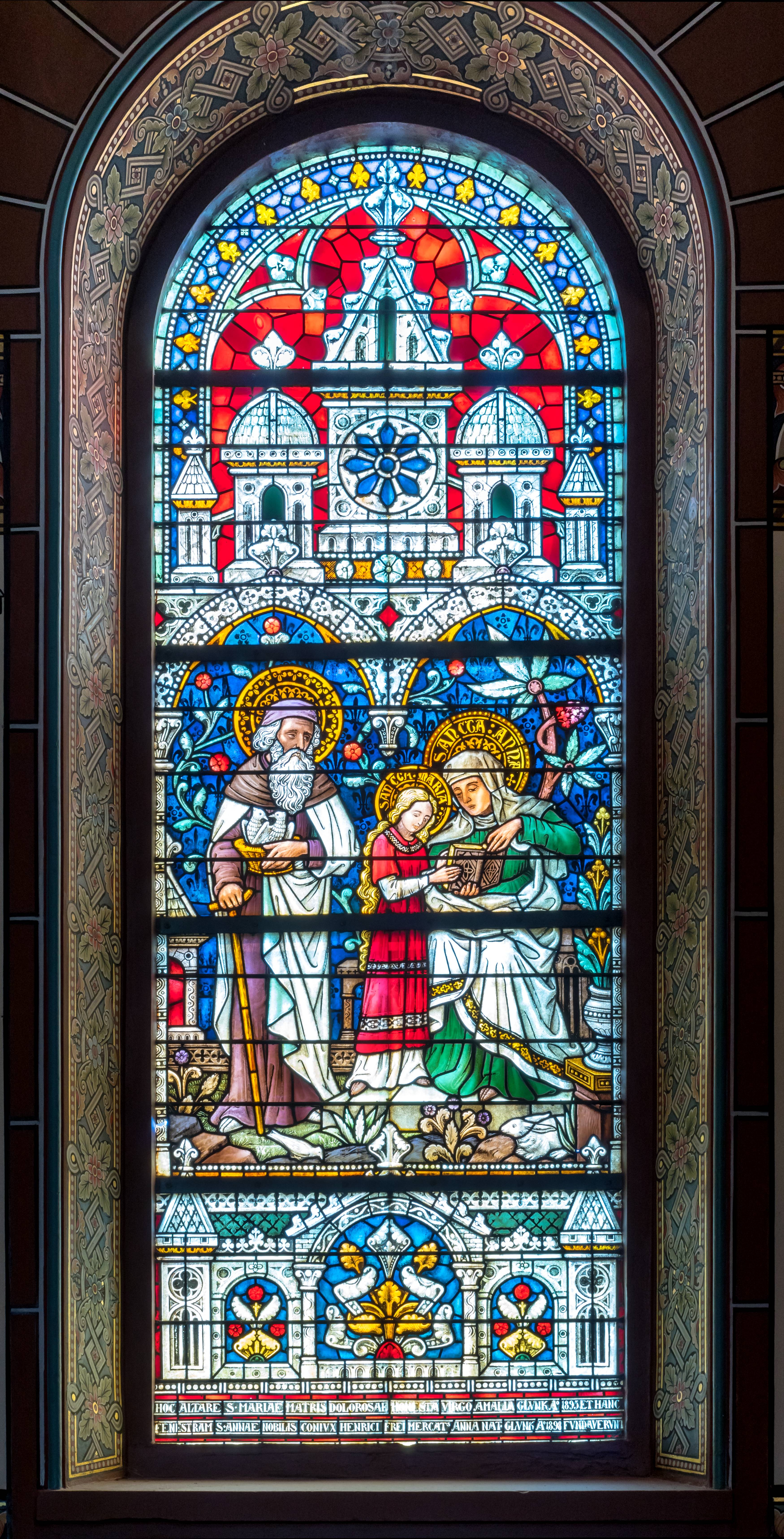
Anna teaches Mary to read in the presence of Joachim (1898)

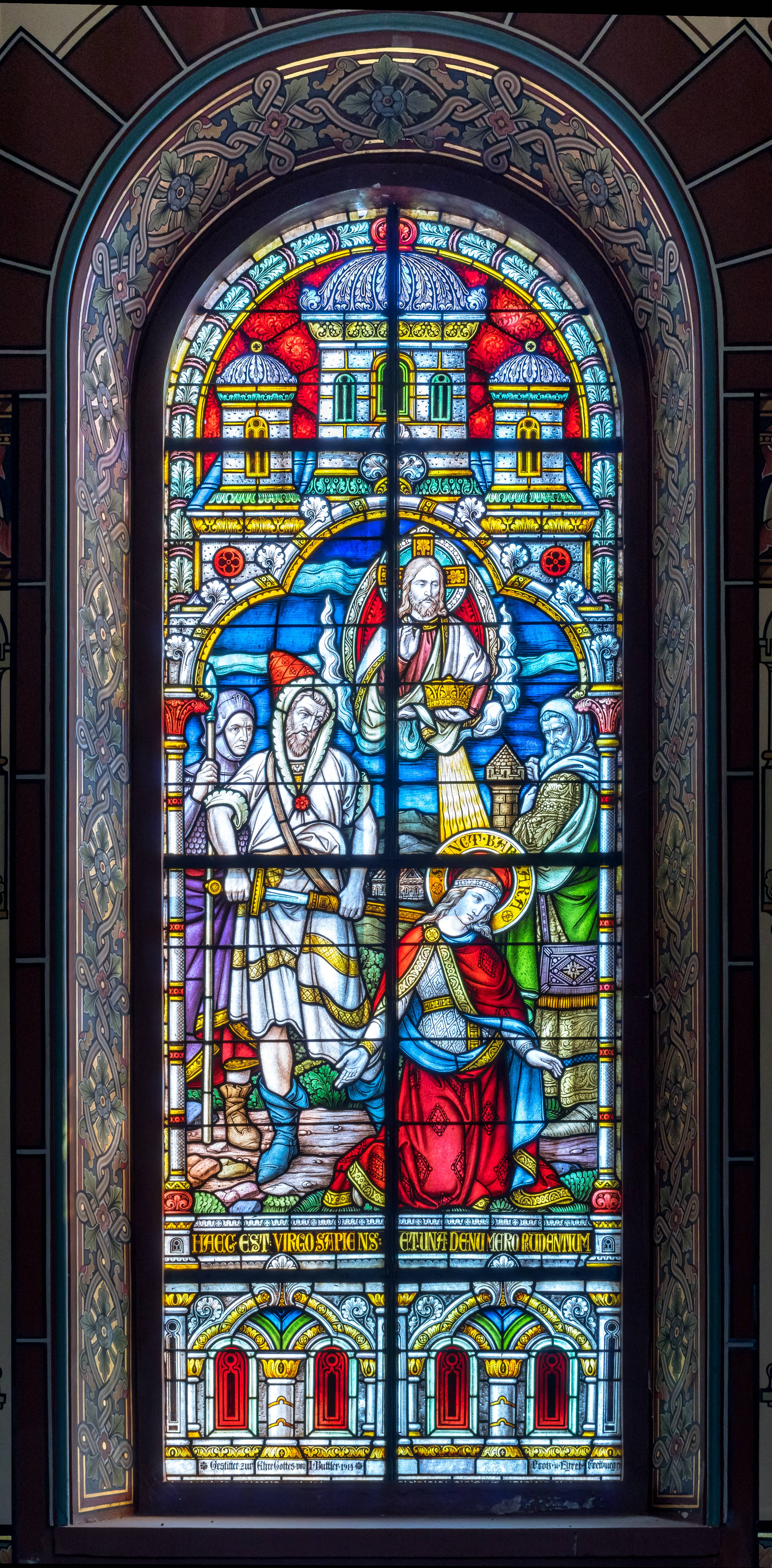
Beheading of Saint Barbara by her father (1914)

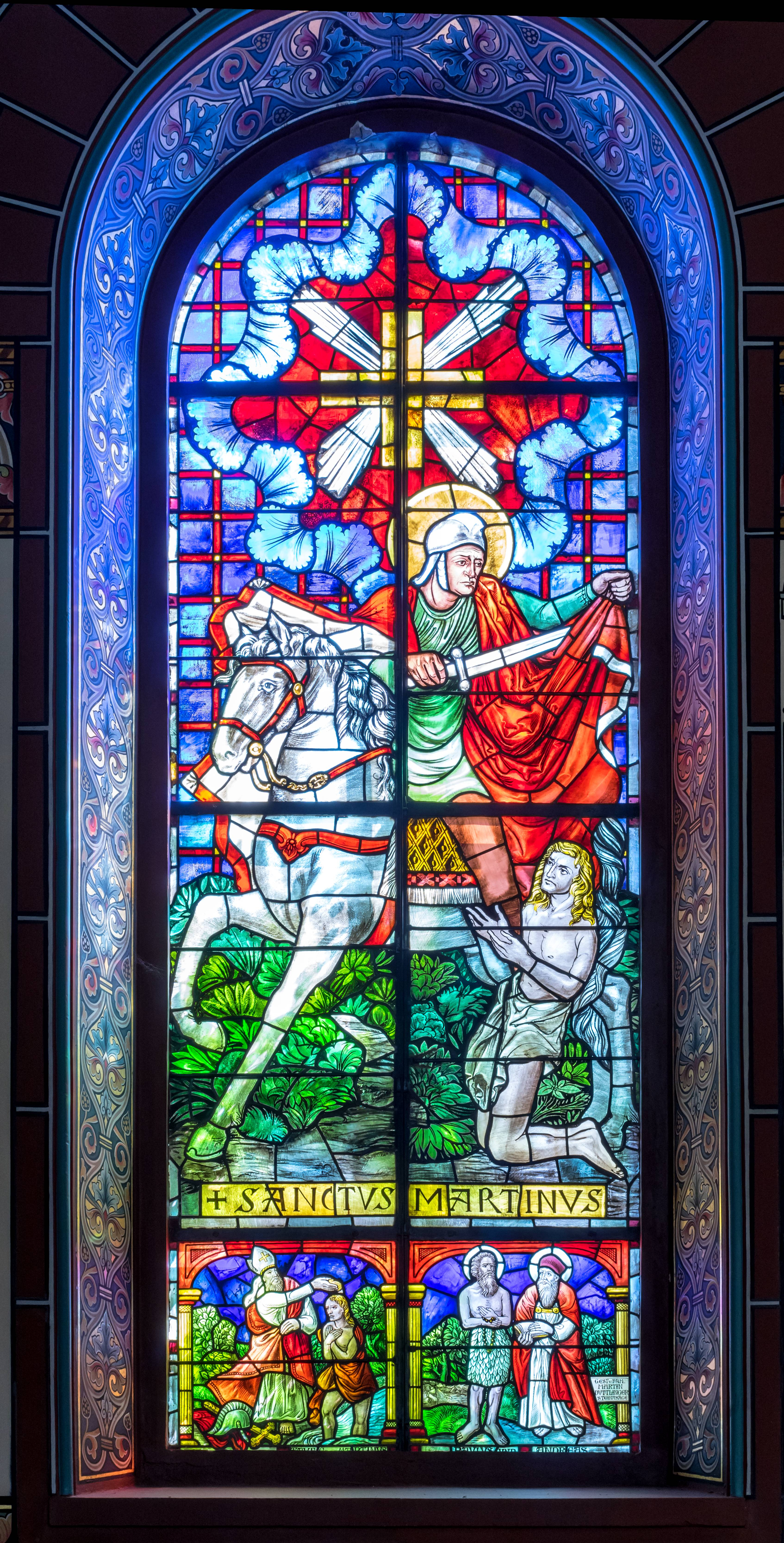
St. Martin shares his cloak with the poor man (1938)

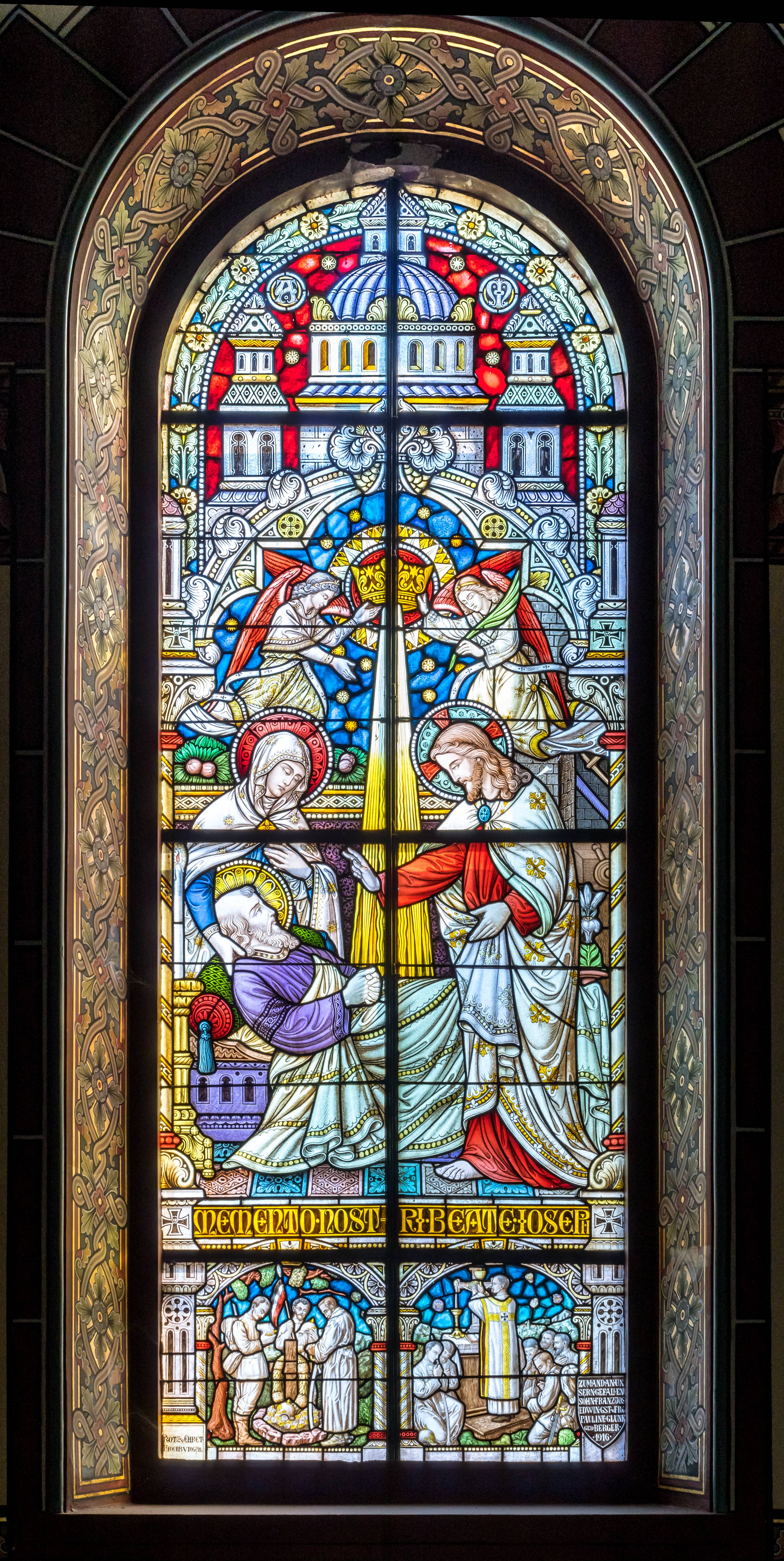
Death of Saint Joseph (1916)

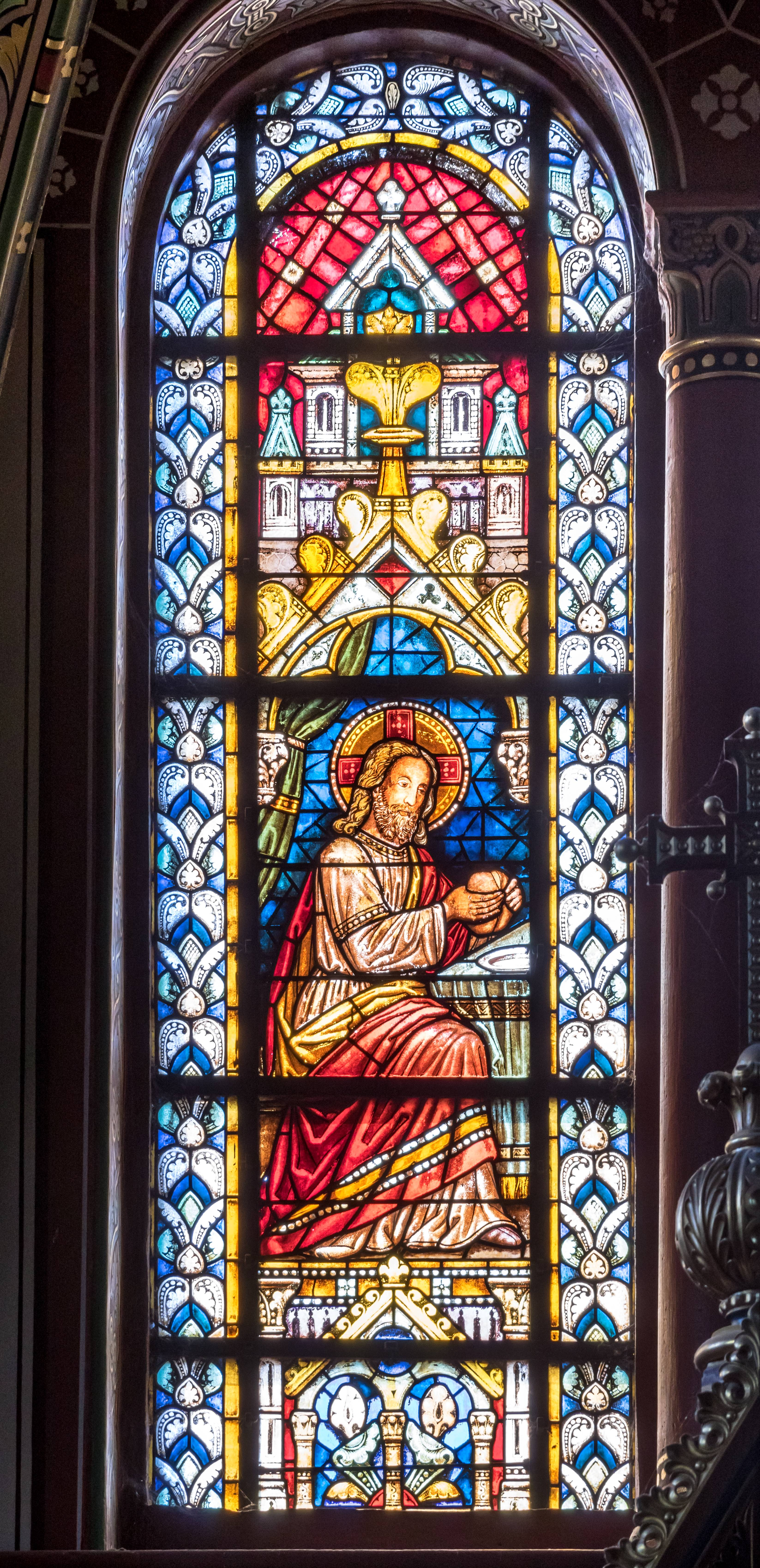
Jesus in Emmaus

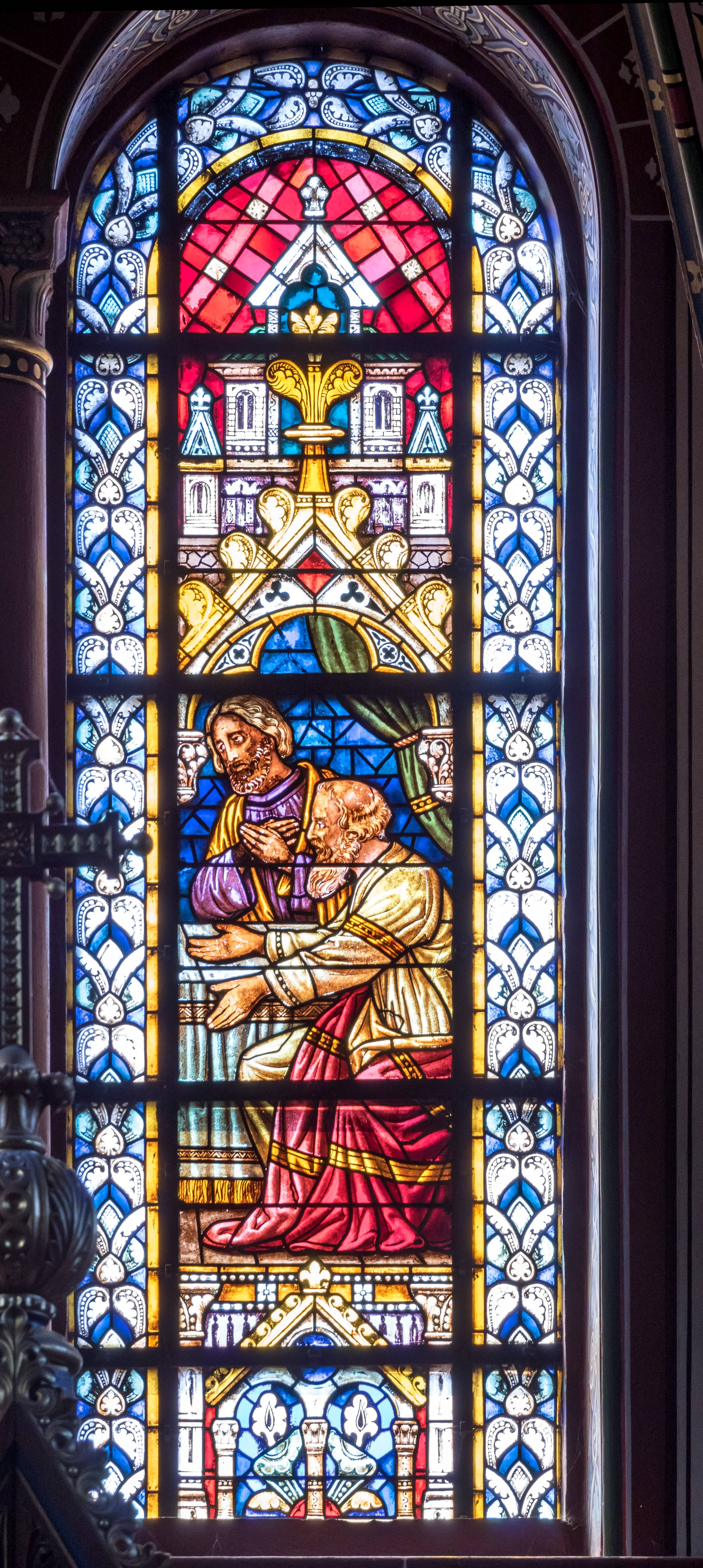
Cleopas and another disciple at Emmaus

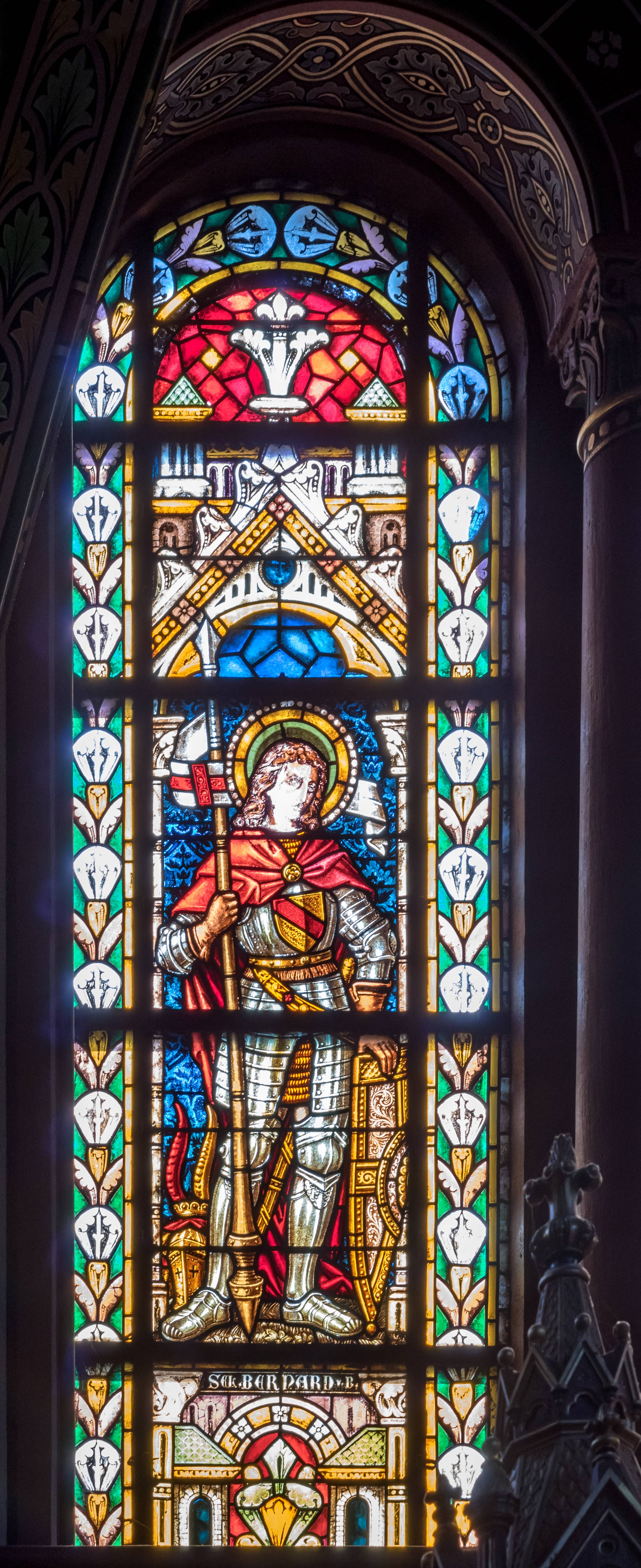
Bernard of Baden

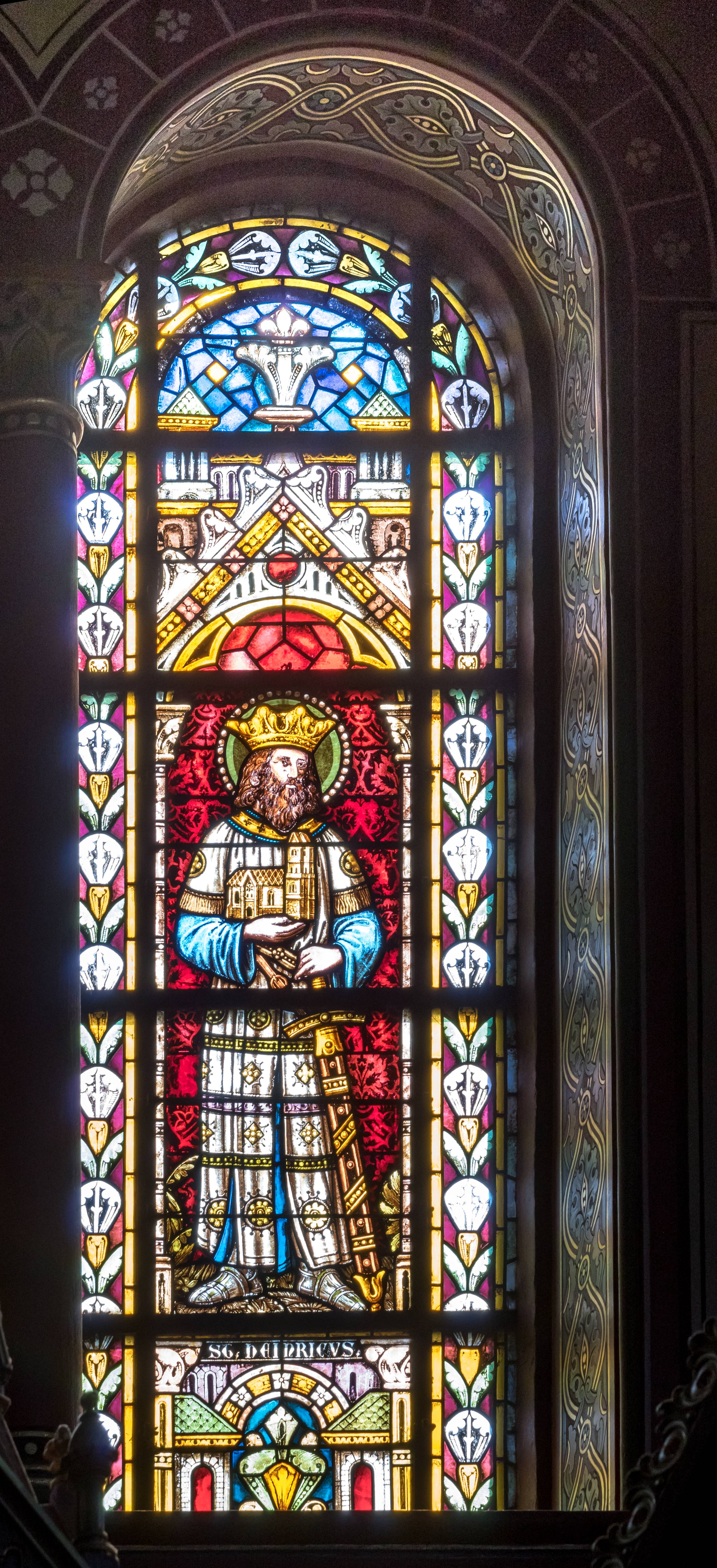
Emperor Heinrich II.

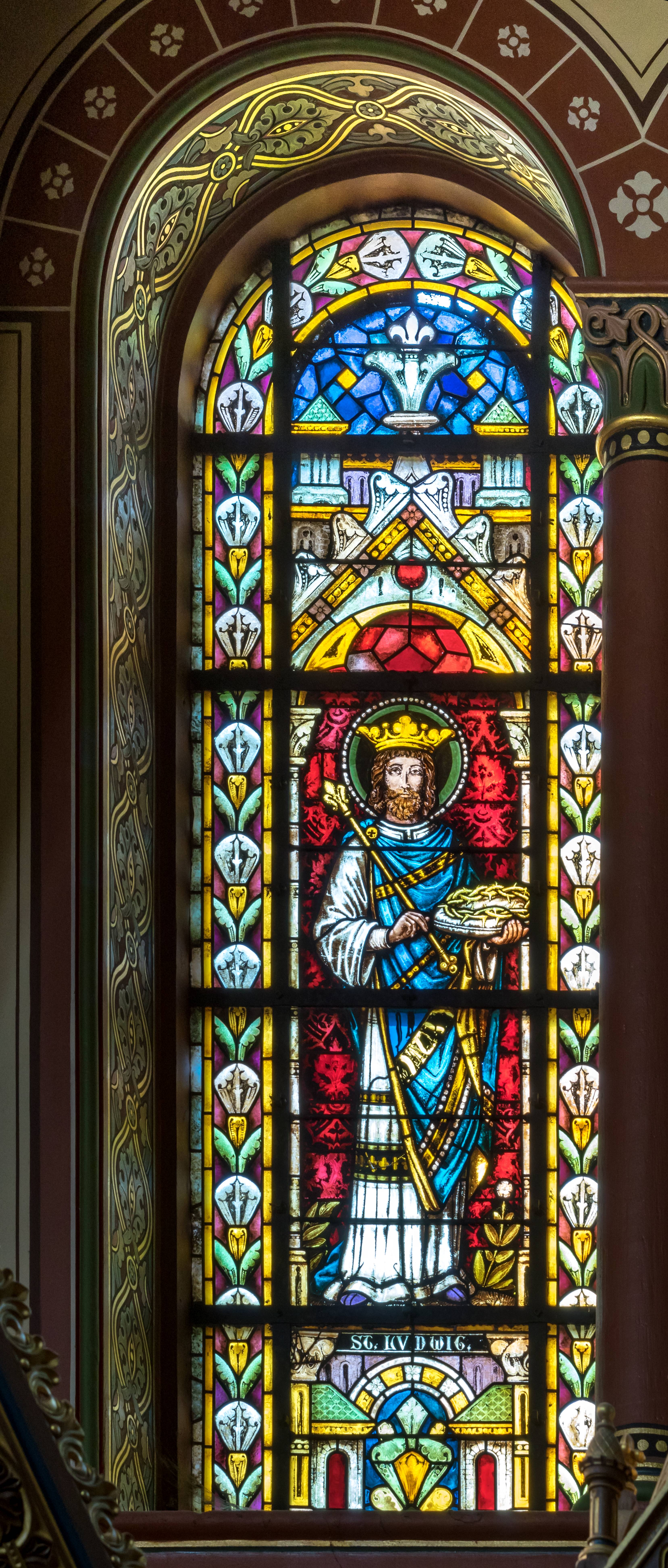
King Louis IX

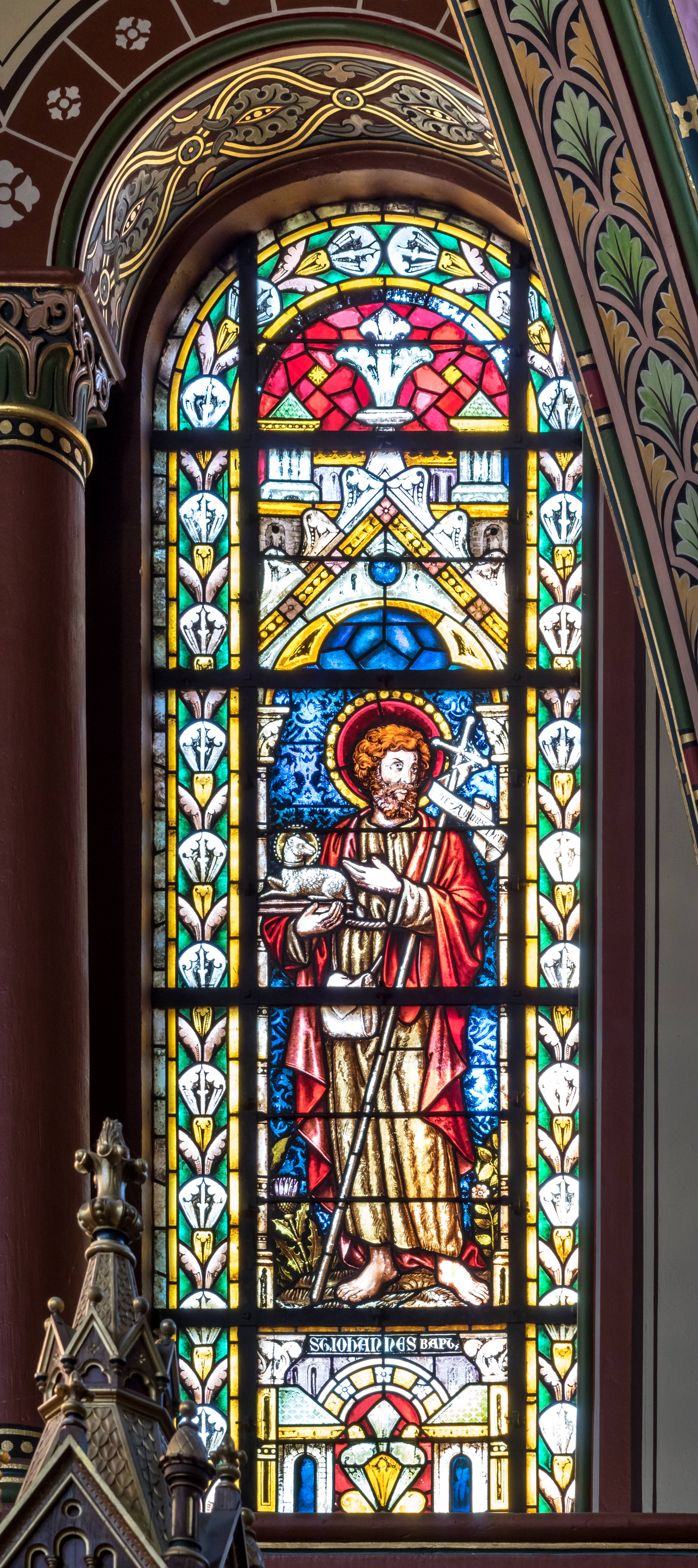
John the Baptist

Seven of the twelve leadlight glass windows in the side aisles are figural. Their creation dates and similarities indicate pairs were donated around the same time.

The oldest windows, near the side altars, depict Anna teaching Mary to read in the presence of Joachim (left aisle) and Francis receiving the stigmata (right aisle). Crafted in 1899 by Helmle & Merzweiler in Freiburg, based on designs by Karl Jennes, the Francis window was donated by the Third Order of Franciscans, and the other by Anna Frei, née Glunk, wife of merchant Heinrich Frei.

Each is followed by an ornamental window. Next, windows show the beheading of Saint Barbara by her father (left aisle) and the baptism of Jesus by John the Baptist (right aisle), both created in 1914 by Protz and Ehret in Freiburg and donated "to the glory of God" by I. Buttler.

While the right aisle has another ornamental window, the southern aisle features the youngest window, depicting Saint Martin sharing his cloak with a beggar (1938). Lower sections show Martin's baptism and Paul of Thebes, linked to the Pauliner Order, with another figure labeled "Andreas." Donated by the Martin Duttlinger family from Steinasäge after their 18-year-old son Martin drowned in the Rhine near Cologne in 1927, it was created shortly before World War II.

Protz and Ehret also crafted the next two windows, donated by Bonndorf families for sons lost in World War I. In 1916, the left aisle window showing the death of Saint Joseph, with German Empire soldiers at a comrade's grave and a field service in the lower third, was donated by Pauline Glunk, née Berger, after her son Edwin Glunk fell on June 12, 1916, at the Western Front. On September 17, 1918, Fridolin Kech fell at Le Cateau, and his mother and sister dedicated the right aisle window that year.According to the Volksbund Deutsche Kriegsgräberfürsorge, he was reinterred at Le Cateau war cemetery, Block 2, Grave 191, as Fridolin Koch. Its upper part depicts believers asking Saint Fridolin to intercede for Bonndorf's protection, identifiable by the church and a woman in Black Forest attire. The lower part shows fieldwork with captions "DIE FRAUEN IM FELDE" (The women in the field) and "IEDES TVT DAS SEINE" (Each does their own).

The remaining two windows, near the organ loft, feature ornamental designs.

=== Rear Wall ===
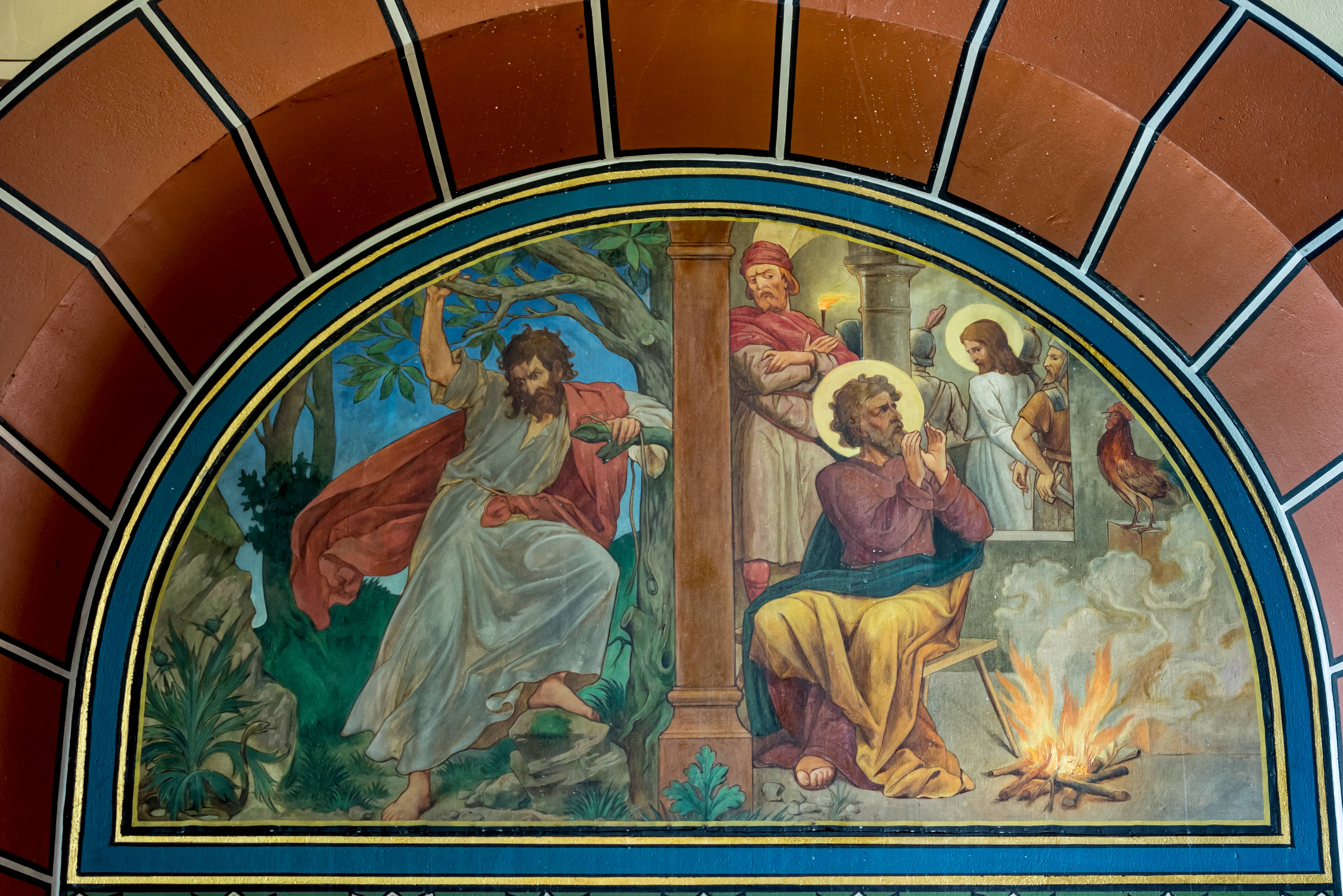
False and True Repentance: Judas and Peter

Three paintings on the church's east wall, themed around repentance, date to the Simmler decorative scheme and complement the two confessionals once located there. On the left side, viewed from the altar, two panels beside a crucifix list 92 names of World War II victims mourned by the parish. (Note: Memorial plaques in the open memorial hall of the municipal cemetery include, among others, the names of 123 World War II fallen, some of which, but not all, correspond to those listed in the church (see transcription at denkmalprojekt.org, February 17, 2007).) Above the cross, a lunette painting, divided by a post, depicts remorse through the contrasting examples of Judas Iscariot and Peter. Both betrayed Jesus, but Judas's remorse led to suicide—symbolized by a tree and rope—while Peter's, after denying Jesus before the Sanhedrin and hearing the rooster crow, led to reconciliation.

On the right side, a painting portrays the sinful woman washing Jesus's feet during his visit to Simon the Leper (Luke 7:37–50). Centered above the entrance portal is a depiction of the return of the prodigal son. Paintings of Mary and Joseph hang on the rear wall. Below them, doors on the tower side lead outside. The right door, beneath Mary, also accesses a spiral staircase to the gallery, the side aisle's attic, and the tower. The left tower stairwell is empty, divided by a false ceiling at gallery level, with ladder access to the other side aisle's attic.

An ornately decorated window in the gallery's rear wall, crafted in 1895 by Helmle & Merzweiler, lies between the spiral staircase on the right and the empty stairwell on the left, within the tower's ringing chamber, where the bellows operator once worked. From the nave, a horizontal curtain is visible behind this window, used during World War II to black out the church during services, preventing light from escaping through the tower facade's two large round-arched windows.

=== Organ ===
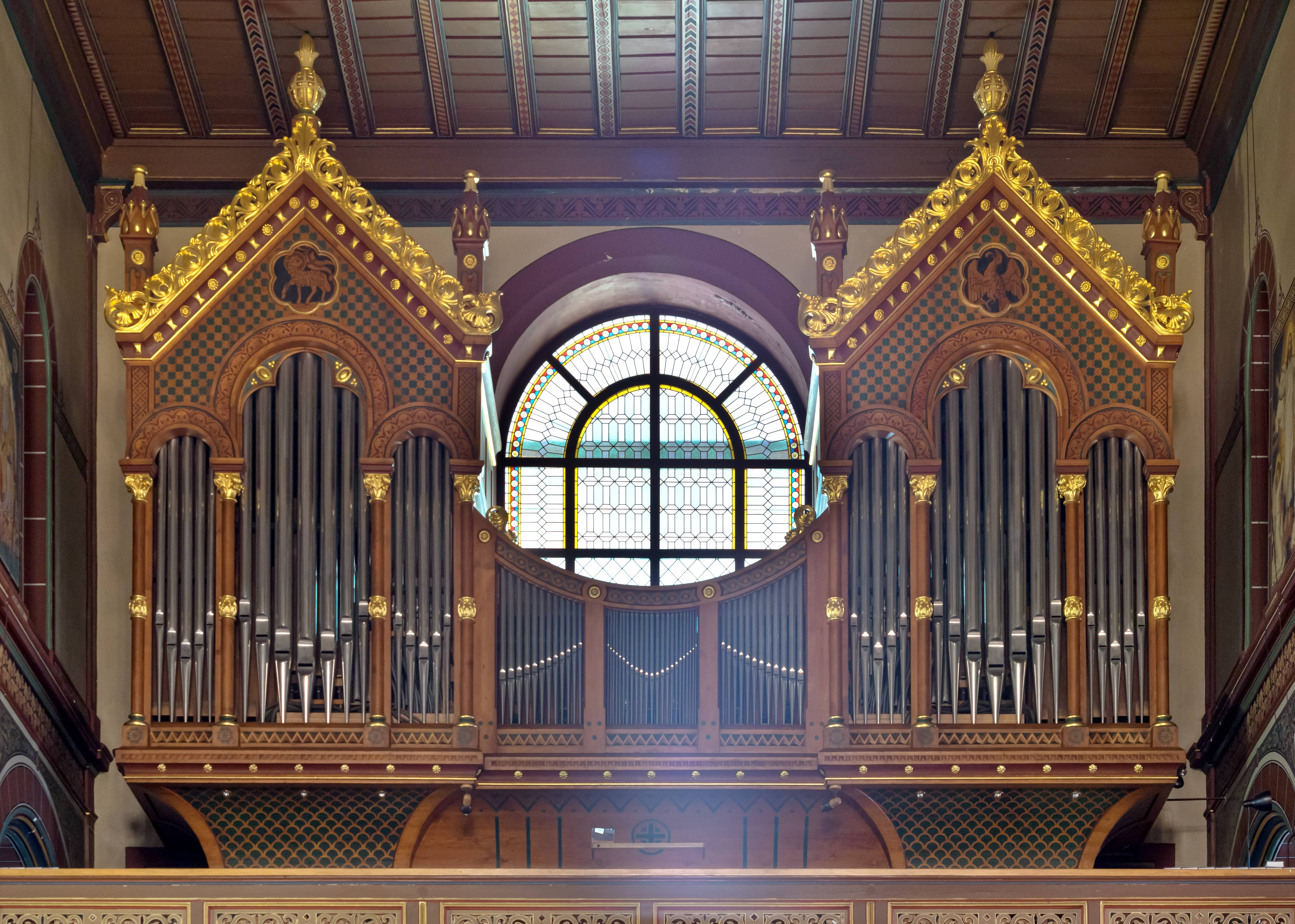
Organ, behind it a decorated arched window with blackout curtains

The first organ was built in 1853 by Konrad Albiez from Unteralpfen. Following Albiez's death in 1878, Wilhelm Schwarz from Überlingen took over its maintenance starting in 1879. In 1908, Wilhelm Schwarz & Sohn constructed a new organ with 26 registers, using a case supplied by Simmler. This organ featured pneumatic cone chests, allowing the console to be placed at the side of the gallery.

In 1984, Freiburger Orgelbau, led by Hartwig and Tilmann Späth, extensively renovated, rebuilt, and expanded the organ. The resulting instrument has 32 registers, mechanical key action with slider chests, electric stop action, and a freestanding console. Seventeen registers, including all wooden pipes, were retained from the existing pipework of Albiez and Schwarz. The Simmler case was preserved and upgraded into a full enclosure by adding roofs, side walls, and a swell box for the second manual. The Hauptwerk occupies the two large outer towers, with the pedal keyboard, diatonically divided, positioned behind. The Schwellwerk is located in the center, behind the low, tripartite round-arched field. In 2014, a sub-octave coupler was added to the Schwellwerk, and all pipes were revoiced to align with enhanced stylistic standards.

==== Disposition ====
I Hauptwerk C–g^{3}
1.	Bourdon	16′
2.	Prinzipal	8′
3.	Großgedackt	8′
4.	Gemshorn	8′
5.	Oktave	4′
6.	Kleingedeckt	4′
7.	Oktave	2′
8.	Großmixtur IV	2 2/3′
9.	Scharf III	1′
10.	Cornet V	8′
11.	Trompete	8′

II Schwellwerk C–g^{3}
12.	Hellprinzipal	8′
13.	Gedecktflöte	8′
14.	Saliconal	8′
15.	Voix céleste	8′
16.	Weitprinzipal	4′
17.	Spillflöte	4′
18.	Nazard	2 2/3′
19.	Flageolett	2′
20.	Terz	1 3/5′
21.	Larigot	1 1/3′
22.	Sifflet	1′
23.	Acuta III	1′
24.	Metalldulcien	16′
25.	Hautbois	8′
	Tremulant

Pedal work c–f^{1}
26.	Subbass	16′
27.	Oktavbass	8′
28.	Spitzflöte	8′
29.	Holzpraestant	4′
30.	Mixturbass IV	2 2/3′
31.	Posaune	16′
32.	Trompetbass	8′

- Key action: mechanich
- Registration: electric

=== Bells ===
The 1842 fire that destroyed the parish church also destroyed its bells. In 1849, Karl Rosenlächer's foundry in Constance cast a new four-bell peal, hung in a twin-bay wooden belfry. The bronze bells bear religious texts and historical references to the former monastery, the church, and secularization. Spared during World War I as an exemplary product of German bell-founding, the large bell and two smaller ones were removed in August 1942 for the wartime metal collection.The large bell, too wide for the tower opening, was broken into two pieces on August 25, 1942.

After the war, the two smaller bells, stored at the Hamburg bell cemetery, were returned to the tower in January and July 1948. On October 12, 1949, Benjamin Grüninger Söhne in Neu-Ulm cast a new large bell to match its predecessor in diameter, weight, and strike note, which had depicted Peter and Paul and bore the inscription: “I rejoice in your joys – I mourn in your tears. Whether joyful or grieving, my sound rings out Jehovah’s song of praise.” The new bell references its predecessor's destruction.

Johannes Wittekind, bell inspector for the Archdiocese of Freiburg, describes the peal's sound as distinctive yet appealing, with a deep, rounded tone. The bright, festive dur-sext chord of bells 2, 3, and 4 is considered Rosenlächer's most extensive and melodious peal in Baden.

By late 2022, severe wear on the 170-year-old belfry and bell yokes, particularly at the yoke pins and bearings, led to the suspension of one bell, followed by three. By February 2023, the peal was suspended, except for the hourly strike.

1. Petrusglocke
Year	1949
Foundry	Benjamin Grüninger, Neu-Ulm
Diameter	132,5 cm
Mass	1500 kg
Strike note	es′-1
Motif	Petrus
Inscription
"You are Peter the rock on which i build my church. Mt 16:18. The old church burned down July 18, 1842. The new one was completed in 1849. On August 25, 1942, the old bell was broken for war purposes." (Strike inscription: "Cast by Master Benjamin Güninger Villingen - Neu Ulm 1949")

2. Marienglocke
Year	1849
Foundry	Karl Rosenlächer, Konstanz
Diameter	105 cm
Mass	700 kg
Strike Note	g′-4
Motif	Annunciation
Inschrift
“If God is for us, who can be against us. Rom 8:31. Blessed are the dead who die in the Lord. Rev 14:13. Hail Mary, full of grace, the Lord is with you. Lk 1:18.Incorrect Bible verse: This is Lk 1:28. [sic]” (Strike inscription: “The treasury built the rectory and church without community labor. It maintains all facilities. Karl Rosenlächer in Constance 1849”)

3 Heilandsglocke
Year	1849
Foundry	Karl Rosenlächer, Konstanz
Diameter	88 cm
Mass	380 kg
Strike Note	b′-2
Motif	Christ with children
Inscription
“Come to me, all you who are weary and burdened, and I will give you rest. Mt 11:28. Let the little children come to me, for theirs is the kingdom of heaven. Mt 19:14.”Incorrect Bible verse: This is Mt 11:28. [sic] (Strike inscription: “The Grand Ducal Baden treasury received all monastery possessions. Karl Rosenlächer in Constance 1849”)

4 Engelsglocke
Year	1849
Foundry	Karl Rosenlächer, Konstanz
Diameter	66 cm
Mass	150 kg
Strike Note	es′'+4
Motif	Christ with children
Inscription
“Glory to God in the highest, and peace to people of good will. Lk 2:14.” (Strike inscription: “The Pauliner Monastery was founded in 1402 and dissolved in 1807. Karl Rosenlächer in Constance 1849”)

=== Reception ===
The harshest critique of the original church likely came from parish priest Fridolin Honold, who wrote to the Baden Finance Ministry on April 6, 1886:

"When one enters the church here, one is positively repelled by the desolate emptiness that meets the eye …, as it resembles an empty warehouse or a neglected railway hall … tears involuntarily come to the eyes, especially when one considers what is spent nowadays on the interiors of waiting rooms, music halls, restaurants, and gymnasiums. Upon entering, the flat, grey-painted wooden ceiling immediately catches the eye, as pitiful as one might find in the hallway of a respectable citizen’s house … In our church, twelve clerestory windows in the main nave, likely part of an earlier plan, have been nailed shut with boards since 1849 (!). In the main nave, due to the lofty, widely spaced arcades, columns, windows, pilasters and friezes, there are no large surfaces, so decorative and ornamental painting could be applied here. In contrast, the choir and side aisles offer splendid surfaces for painting. These walls were once coated with light yellow ochre—the familiar kitchen color—and adorned with very plain pilasters, pilasters and foliage friezes, etc. Now everything has faded and turned a pale grey.

In a letter to the Archdiocesan Ordinariate in Freiburg, he added that the side altars were so poor that a well-traveled painter described them as resembling milk crates. The 1970s restoration revealed that the wall treatment Honold likened to a neglected railway hall consisted primarily of blockwork painting.

Franz Baer, from the Archdiocesan Building Office, criticized the tower's upper section, the unrealized clerestory windows, and the vaulting's decorative shortcomings, noting the church's blend of early Christian and early Romanesque motifs typical of Hübsch's style. Berckmüller adapted his evangelical church design, simplifying it due to budget constraints. The Finance Ministry praised Berckmüller's “outstanding” work but admitted the interior's whitewash had become unsightly.

Honold's efforts and Simmler's work created a “remarkably rich and cohesive interior,” one of the region's most characteristic and high-quality Gesamtkunstwerke. Hans Jakob Wörner credited Honold's vision and resources for the “impressive” pictorial cycle, achieving a harmonious blend of architecture, painting, and sculpture.
