= Freiburg I (electoral district) =

State electoral district of Germany

46: Freiburg I
- Electoral district for the Landtag of Baden-Württemberg
- Freiburg I in 2026
- District: Freiburg, Breisgau-Hochschwarzwald, and Waldshut
- Electorate: 129,141 (2026)
- Major settlements: Freiburg (partial), Breitnau, Buchenbach, Eisenbach (Hochschwarzwald), Feldberg (Schwarzwald), Friedenweiler, Glottertal, Gundelfingen, Heuweiler, Hinterzarten, Kirchzarten, Lenzkirch, Löffingen, Oberried, St. Märgen, St. Peter (Hochschwarzwald), Schluchsee, Stegen, Titisee-Neustadt, Bernau im Schwarzwald, Bonndorf im Schwarzwald, Dachsberg (Südschwarzwald), Grafenhausen, Häusern, Höchenschwand, Ibach, St. Blasien, Todtmoos, Ühlingen-Birkendorf, and Wutach

Current electoral district
- Party: Green
- Member: Daniela Evers

Freiburg I is an electoral constituency (German: Wahlkreis) represented in the Landtag of Baden-Württemberg. Since 2026, it has elected one member via first-past-the-post voting. Voters cast a second vote under which additional seats are allocated proportionally state-wide. Under the constituency numbering system, it is designated as constituency 46. It is split between the city of Freiburg, and the districts of Breisgau-Hochschwarzwald and Waldshut.

== Geography ==
The constituency consists of:

- The city districts of Altstadt, Ebnet, Günterstal, Herdern, Kappel, Littenweiler, Mittelwiehre, Neuburg, Oberau, Oberwiehre, and Waldsee, within the city Freiburg.
- The municipalities of Breitnau, Buchenbach, Eisenbach (Hochschwarzwald), Feldberg (Schwarzwald), Friedenweiler, Glottertal, Gundelfingen, Heuweiler, Hinterzarten, Kirchzarten, Lenzkirch, Löffingen, Oberried, St. Märgen, St. Peter (Hochschwarzwald), Schluchsee, Stegen, and Titisee-Neustadt, within the district of Breisgau-Hochschwarzwald.
- The municipalities of Bernau im Schwarzwald, Bonndorf im Schwarzwald, Dachsberg (Südschwarzwald), Grafenhausen, Häusern, Höchenschwand, Ibach, St. Blasien, Todtmoos, Ühlingen-Birkendorf, and Wutach, within the district of Waldshut.

There were 129,141 eligible voters in 2026.

== Members ==
=== First mandate ===
Both prior to and since the electoral reforms for the 2026 election, the winner of the plurality of the vote (first-past-the-post) in every constituency won the first mandate.

| Election | Member | Party | % |
|---|---|---|---|
| 1976 | Hans Filbinger | CDU | |
| 1980 | Ludgar Reddemann | CDU | |
| 1984 | Ludgar Reddemann | CDU | |
| 1988 | Ludgar Reddemann | CDU | |
| 1992 | Ludgar Reddemann | CDU | |
| 1996 | Ludgar Reddemann | CDU | |
| 2001 | Klaus Schüle | CDU | 39.7 |
| 2006 | Klaus Schüle | CDU | 40.0 |
| 2011 | Reinhold Pix | Grüne | 34.5 |
| 2016 | Reinhold Pix | Grüne | 39.0 |
| 2021 | Daniela Evers | Grüne | 40.2 |
| 2026 | Daniela Evers | Grüne | 35.6 |

=== Second mandate ===
Prior to the electoral reforms for the 2026 election, the seats in the state parliament were allocated proportionately amongst parties which received more than 5% of valid votes across the state. The seats that were won proportionally for parties that did not win as many first mandates as seats they were entitled to, were allocated to their candidates which received the highest proportion of the vote in their respective constituencies. This meant that following some elections, a constituency would have one or more members elected under a second mandate.

Prior to 2011, these second mandates were allocated to the party candidates who got the greatest number of votes, whilst from 2011-2021, these were allocated according to percentage share of the vote.

| Election | Member | Party | Member | Party |
|---|---|---|---|---|
| 1976 | Klaus Rösch | FDP | Jürgen Meyer | SPD |
| 1980 | Hans Dietrich Erichsen | Grüne | | |
| 1984 | Hans-Dieter Stürmer | Grüne | | |
| 1988 | Johanna Maria Quis | Grüne | | |
| Jul 1990 | Barbara Schroeren-Boersch | Grüne | | |
| 1992 | Walter Witzel | Grüne | Gustav-Adolf Haas | SPD |
| 1996 | Walter Witzel | Grüne | | |
| 2001 | Walter Witzel | Grüne | Gustav-Adolf Haas | SPD |
| 2006 | Reinhold Pix | Grüne | Gustav-Adolf Haas | SPD |
| Nov 2009 | Reinhold Pix | Grüne | Walter Krögner | SPD |
| 2011 | | | | |
2016
2021

== Election results ==
=== 2026 election ===
State election (2026): Freiburg I
| Notes: | Blue background denotes the winner of the electorate vote. Pink background denotes a candidate elected from their party list. Yellow background denotes an electorate win by a list member, or other incumbent. A ✓ or ✗ denotes status of any incumbent, win or lose respectively. | | | | | | |
| Party | Candidate | Votes | % | ±% | Party votes | % | ±% |
|---|---|---|---|---|---|---|---|
| Greens | ✓ Daniela Evers | 34,508 | 35.6 | ▼4.7 | 39,502 | 40.6 | ▲0.4 |
| CDU | Ingo Bauer | 27,738 | 28.6 | ▲9.2 | 24,247 | 24.9 | ▲5.5 |
| AfD | Sebastian Ruth | 9,709 | 10.0 | ▲4.9 | 10.496 | 10.8 | ▲5.7 |
| Left | Sebastian Böhm | 8,738 | 9.0 | ▲2.2 | 8,157 | 8.4 | ▲1.6 |
| SPD | Walter Krögner | 7,459 | 7.7 | ▼3.5 | 4,877 | 5.0 | ▼6.2 |
| FW | Stephan Schneider | 2,769 | 2.9 | Steady | 1,814 | 1.9 | ▼1.0 |
| FDP | Heschu Hasan | 2,056 | 2.1 | ▼5.4 | 3,433 | 3.5 | ▼4.0 |
| Volt | Georg Köchling | 1,528 | 1.6 | ▲0.7 | 966 | 1.0 | ▲0.1 |
| BSW | Peter Riedlinger | 1,303 | 1.3 | | 1,387 | 1.4 | |
| APT | | | | | 742 | 0.8 | |
| dieBasis | Jürgen Geillinger | 594 | 0.6 | ▼0.7 | 435 | 0.4 | ▼0.9 |
| PARTEI | Josef Drexl | 589 | 0.6 | ▼0.9 | 350 | 0.4 | ▼1.1 |
| ÖDP | | | | | 173 | 0.2 | ▼0.6 |
| Bündnis C | | | | | 151 | 0.2 | ▼0.1 |
| Pensioners | | | | | 107 | 0.1 | |
| Values | | | | | 104 | 0.1 | |
| KlimalisteBW | | | | | 68 | 0.1 | ▼1.4 |
| Verjüngungsforschung | | | | | 58 | 0.1 | |
| Team Todenhöfer | | | | | 51 | 0.1 | |
| PdF | | | | | 50 | 0.1 | |
| Humanists | | | | | 31 | 0.0 | |
| Informal votes | | 630 | | | 422 | | |
| Total valid votes | | 96,991 | | | 97,199 | | |
| Turnout | | 97,621 | 76.2 | ▲5.6 | | | |
| Greens hold | Majority | 6,770 | 7.0 | | | | |

== See also ==
- Politics of Baden-Württemberg
- Landtag of Baden-Württemberg
