= Schluchsee, Baden-Württemberg =

Schluchsee
- Municipality
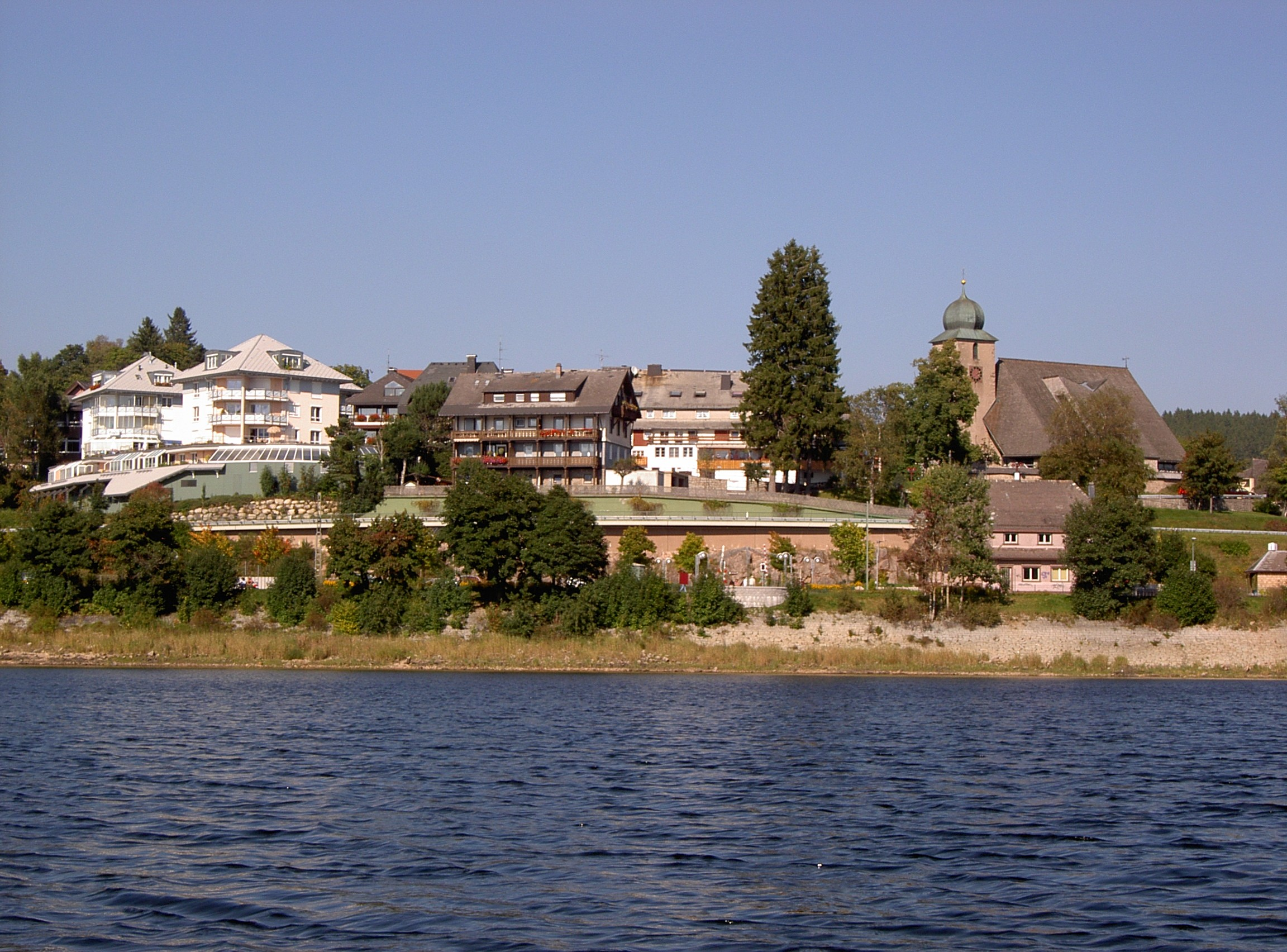
- The town of Schluchsee seen from the Schluchsee reservoir

- Coat of arms

- Location of Schluchsee within Breisgau-Hochschwarzwald district
- Interactive map of Schluchsee
- Location within Germany Location within Baden-Württemberg
- Coordinates: 47°49′10″N 08°10′51″E
- Country: Germany
- State: Baden-Württemberg
- Admin. region: Freiburg
- District: Breisgau-Hochschwarzwald

Government
  - Mayor (2017–25): Jürgen Kaiser (Ind.)

Area
  - Total: 69.43 km^{2} (26.81 sq mi)
- Elevation: 952 m (3,123 ft)

Population (2025-12-31)
  - Total: 2,610
  - Density: 37.6/km^{2} (97.4/sq mi)
- Time zone: UTC+01:00 (CET)
  - Summer (DST): UTC+02:00 (CEST)
- Postal codes: 79859
- Dialling codes: 07656
- Vehicle registration: FR
- Website: www.gemeinde-schluchsee.de

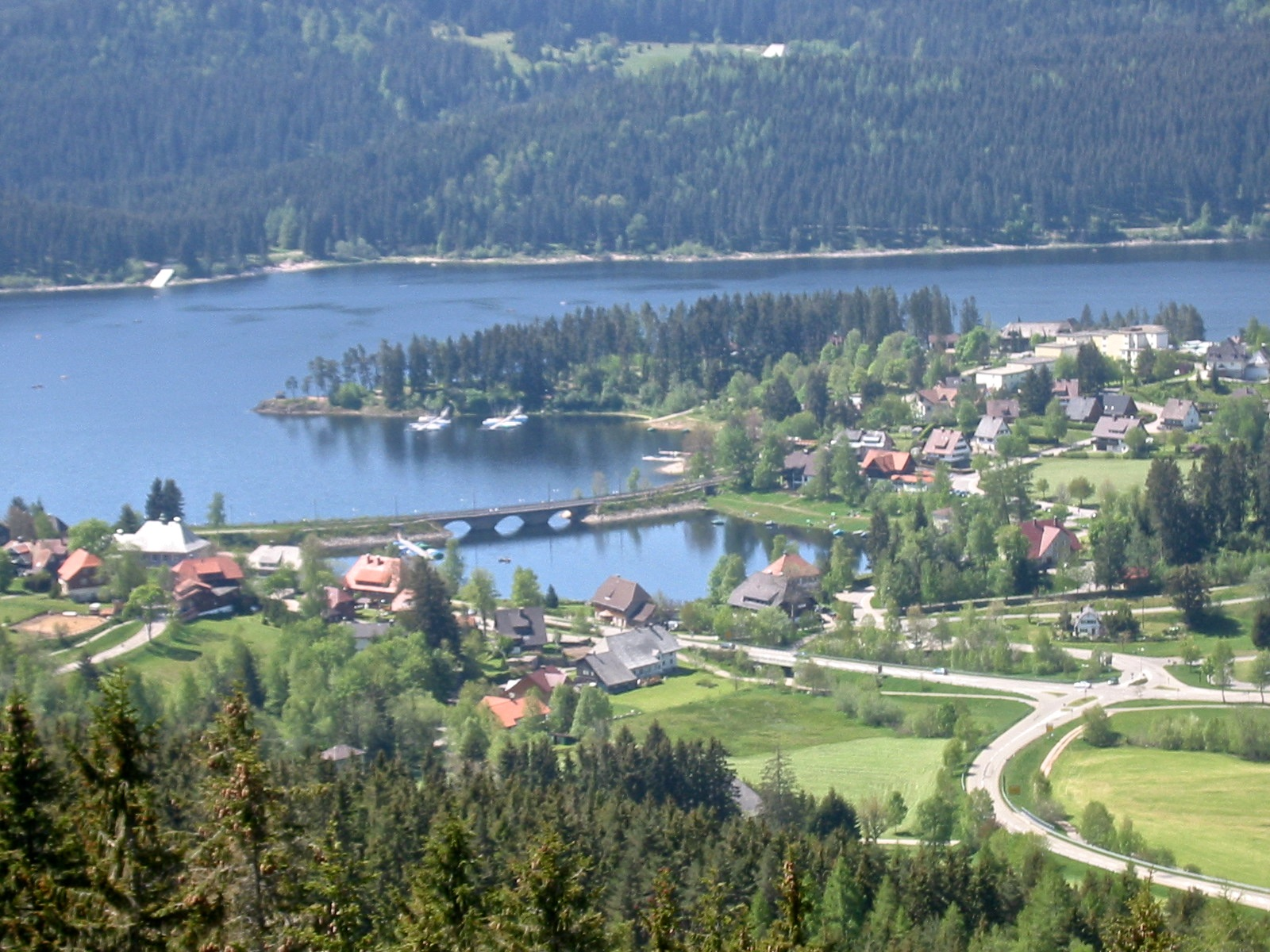
The Schluchsee and the Schluchsee municipality

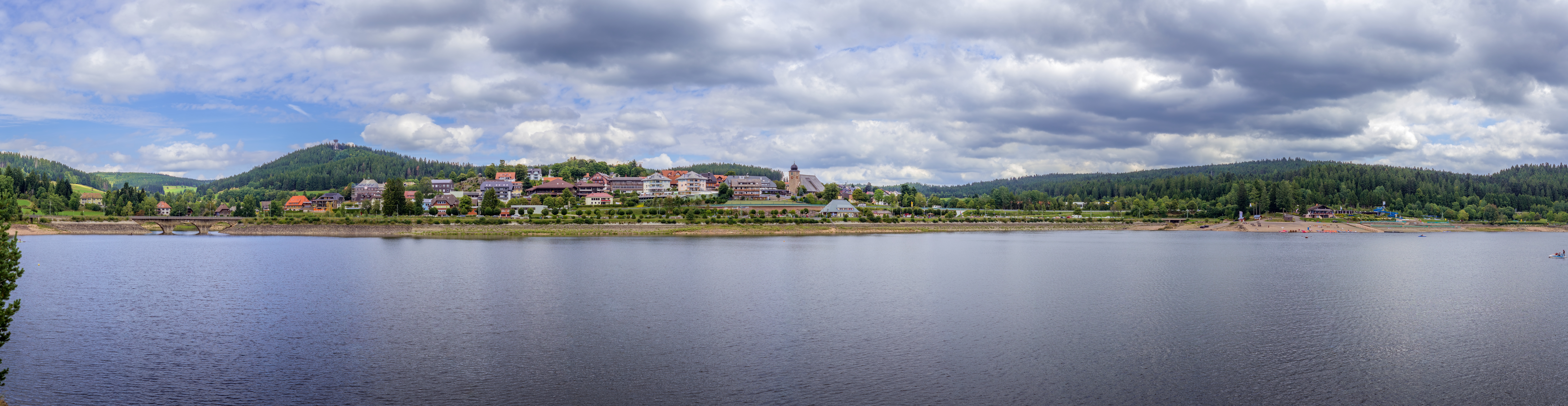
View of Schluchsee from the Amalienruhe view point

Schluchsee (German pronunciation: [ˈʃluːxˌzeː]) is a town in the county of Breisgau-Hochschwarzwald in the German state of Baden-Württemberg. It is located near the Schluchsee reservoir and is located in the Southern Black Forest Nature Park.

== Geography ==
The municipal area extends at an altitude of 700 to 1300 meters above sea level. The highest point is the Schnepfhalde in the northwest at 1299 meters above sea level. The lowest point is located at the inlet of the Taubach and the Schwarza.

=== Municipal structure ===
As a result of municipal mergers in the 1970s, Schluchsee now has a total of five districts, each with its own municipal boundaries. In addition to the eponymous district of Schluchsee, these are Blasiwald, Faulenfürst, Fischbach, and Schönenbach. These five districts are divided into a total of six residential areas as defined by the Baden-Württemberg Gemeindeordnung. In terms of name and size, these are mostly identical to the individual districts, with the exception of Schluchsee, which has two residential areas: Schluchsee-Village and Aha-Äule. The two districts of Schönenbach and Blasiwald also form Ortschaft within the meaning of the Baden-Württemberg Municipal Code. This means that they have a local advisory council (Ortschaftsrat) with a Head of the local community (Ortsvorsteher) as its chairperson.

The district of Muchenland and the hamlets of Althütte, Eisenbreche, Loch, Sommerseite, and Winterseite belong to the district of Blasiwald. The village of Faulenfürst and the village of Seebrugg (Seebruck) belong to the district of Faulenfürst. The village of (Ober-)Fischbach and the village of Hinterhäuser and Schwende belong to the district of Fischbach. The district of Schluchsee includes the village of Schluchsee, the hamlets of Äule, Oberaha, Unteraha, and Unterfischbach, the Dresselbach farmstead, and the settlements of Forsthaus Oberaha and Unterkrummen. The district of Schönenbach includes the village of Schönenbach and the farms of Oberschwarzhalden and Unterschwarzhalden. The abandoned village of Wüstengraben is located in the Blasiwald district, and the abandoned village of Oberkrummen is located in the Schluchsee district.

Districts of the municipality of Schluchsee and their population:

District	Population
Schluchsee *	1700
Blasiwald	280
Faulenfürst **	170
Fischbach ***	250
Schönenbach	120
Gemeinde Schluchsee	2520

* with Aha-Äule, Dresselbach and Unterfischbach

** with Seebrugg

*** with Hinterhäuser and Schwende

=== Neighboring municipalities ===
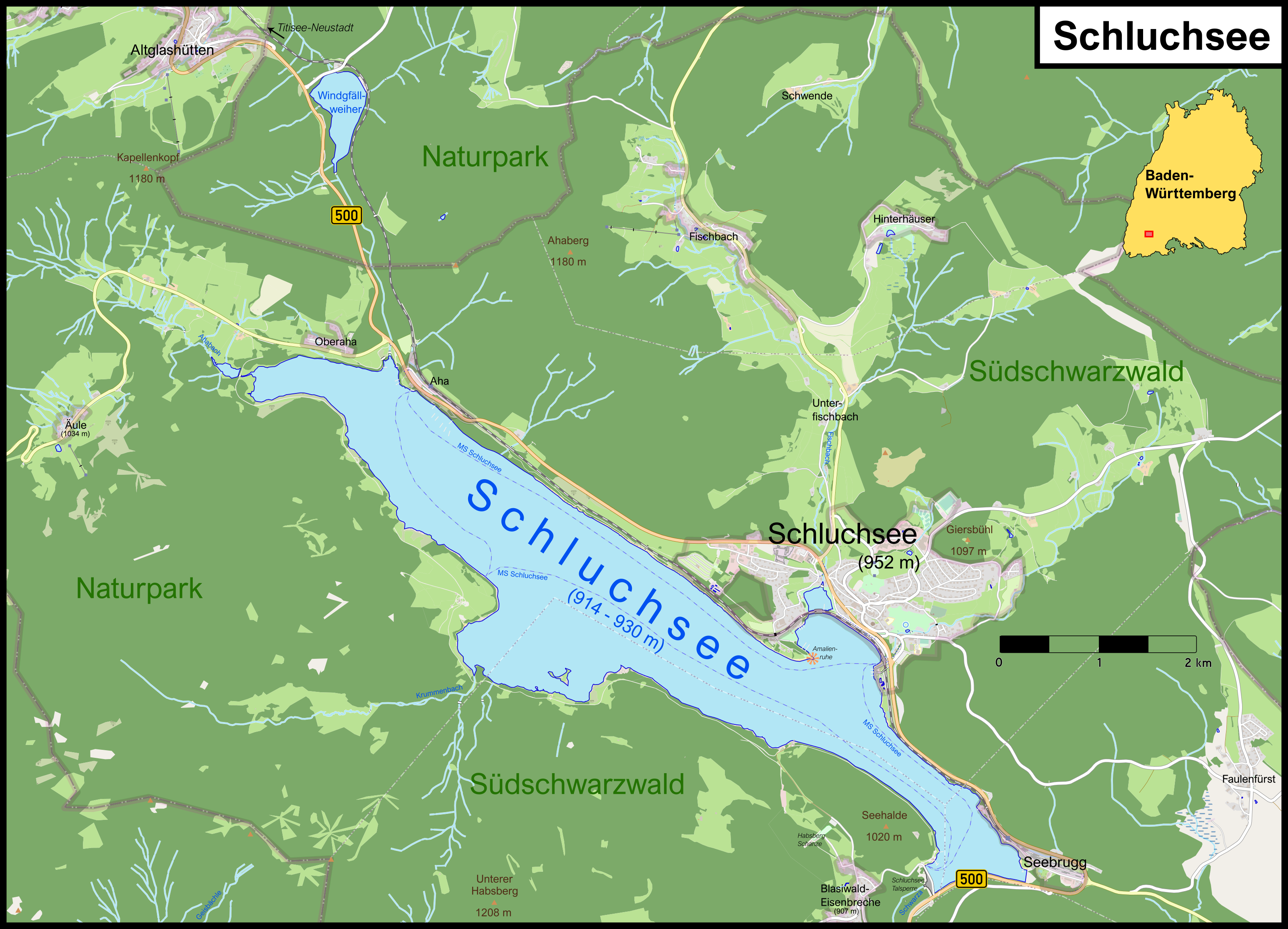
Map of Schluchsee municipality

Schluchsee borders the following municipalities (clockwise): Feldberg (Baden-Württemberg), Lenzkirch (both in the county of Breisgau-Hochschwarzwald), Bonndorf im Schwarzwald, Grafenhausen, Ühlingen-Birkendorf, Höchenschwand, Häusern, and Sankt Blasien (all in the county of Waldshut).

=== Climate ===
The average temperature in Schluchsee is +5.6 °C (January −2.2 °C; July +14.4 °C). The average amount of rainfall is 1503 mm. The rainfall is evenly distributed throughout the year. (September is the driest month, December the wettest) (Data refers to the period 1961–1990)

== History ==
Schluchsee is one of the oldest places in the Black Forest to be mentioned in written records. After a diploma issued by Emperor Otto II on June 5, 983, was proven to be a forgery, the first reliable record dates back to 1076. This is taken from a document from 1125 confirming the donation of the "Schluchsee estate" to Saint Blaise Abbey. In the Middle Ages, the bailiwick rights belonged to the House of Fürstenberg. At the end of the 17th century, Saint Blaise Abbey regained sovereignty. In 1803, as a result of the Reichsdeputationshauptschluss, it passed to the Knights Hospitaller von Heitersheim. With the establishment of the Grand Duchy of Baden, the latter had to cede their sovereign rights to the new state in 1806 under the Rhine Confederation Act.

In the 19th century, the population began to impoverish, leading to emigration and a significant decline in population. Suffering lasting economic damage due to hunger and crop failures, many farmers were forced to sell their farms to the state. It was not until the construction of the Three Lakes Railway from Titisee to Seebrugg, which opened in 1926, that tourism began to boom again. Equally decisive for this, however, was the construction of the dam and the resulting impoundment of the lake, which, in addition to its importance for energy production, also became a popular leisure and recreational destination.

On July 1, 1971, the previously independent municipalities of Faulenfürst and Fischbach were incorporated into Schluchsee, followed by Schönenbach on September 1, 1973. Blasiwald was incorporated on July 1, 1974.

== Politics ==
=== Local Council ===
In the 2024 Baden-Württemberg local elections, the SPD lost one seat to the Freie Wähler List Schluchsee, which was running for the first time, resulting in the following distribution of seats

Party / List	Seats	percentage of votes
SPD	5	40,85 %
CDU	6	47,43 %
Freie Wähler	1	12,52 %

=== Mayor ===
Jürgen Kaiser (independent) has been mayor since 2009. He was re-elected in 2017 and 2025.

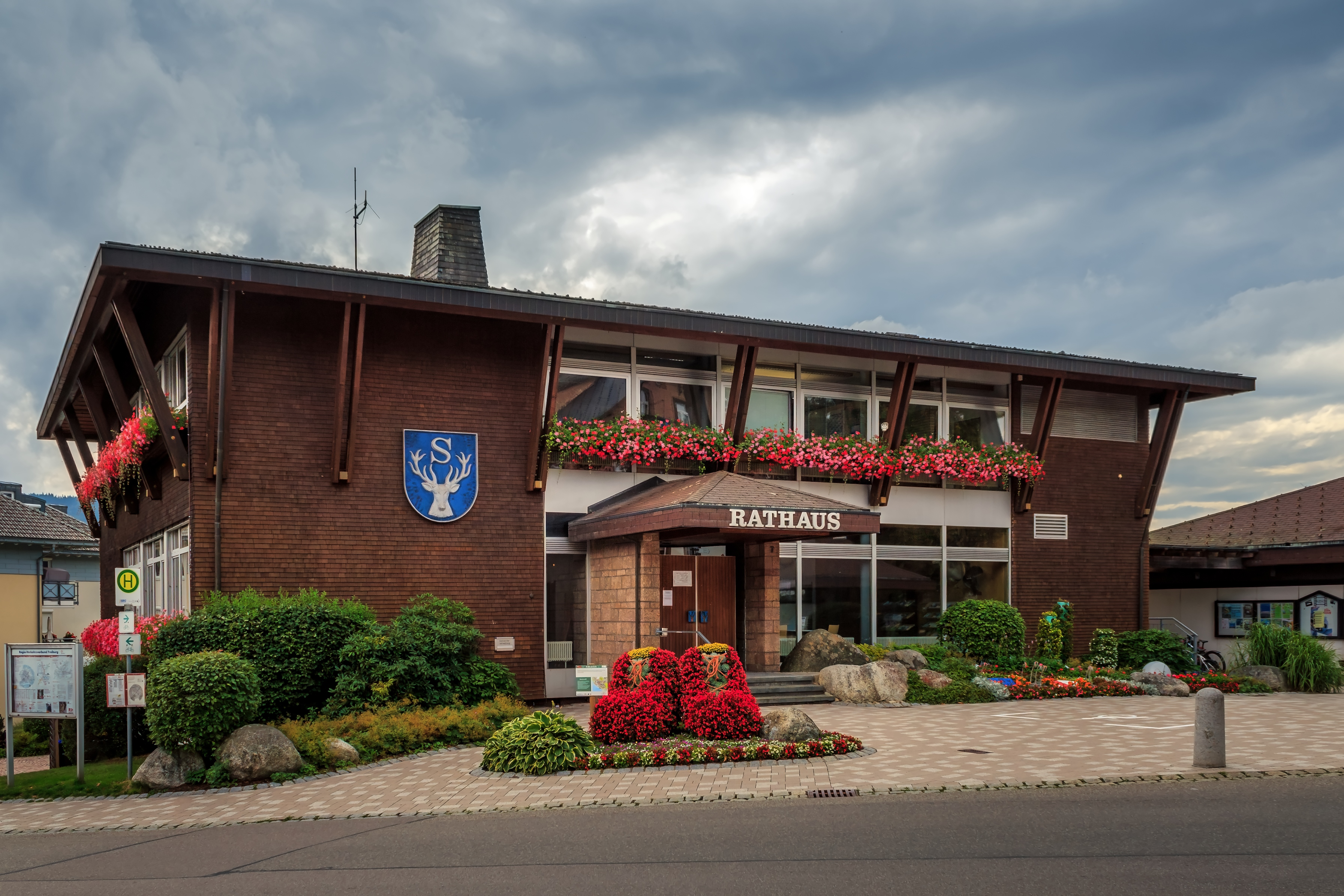
Schluchsee Town Hall

Mayor since 1945

Mandate	Name
1945–1946	Johann Stier
1946–1959	Josef Schlachter
1959–1961	Paul Albiez
1961–1996	Hermann Schlachter

Mandate	Name
1996–2004	Theodor Ehret
2004–2009	Manfred Merstetter
since 2009	Jürgen Kaiser

=== Municipal partnership ===
Schluchsee has a municipal partnership with the French municipality of Sevrier on Lake Annecy.

== Economy and infrastructure ==
Economically, the municipality is almost entirely dependent on tourism.

== Transport ==
Schluchsee is connected to the railway network by the Three Lakes Railway to Titisee, which runs along the northern shore of the lake. From Titisee, there are connections via the Höllentalbahn to Freiburg and Donaueschingen. In addition to the terminus in Seebrugg, there are stations and stops in Schluchsee and Aha.

The Three Lakes Cycle Route leads from Freiburg via the Rinken Pass to Titisee and on via the Windgfällweiher to Schluchsee.

The Bundesstraße 500 highway (Schwarzwaldhochstraße) also runs along the northern shore of the lake and leads through the town, past the dam to Waldshut on the High Rhine to the south.

== Culture and Attractions ==
=== Hiking ===
Schluchsee is located on the Mittelweg, a long-distance hiking trail of the Schwarzwaldverein from Pforzheim to Waldshut, and on the Schluchtensteig from Stühlingen to Wehr.

The cultural monument of the stone circles at Schluchsee, located on the path between the Eisenbreche inn and the dam at Schluchsee.

=== Sports ===
Schluchsee offers many sporting opportunities in winter with skiing (various Cross-country skiing trail and good downhill runs on the nearby Feldberg) and in summer with sailing. The Schluchsee Sailing Club holds regattas during the summer months.

The Schluchsee Run has been held since 1984. This now traditional running competition takes place on a circuit around Schluchsee.

=== Religion ===
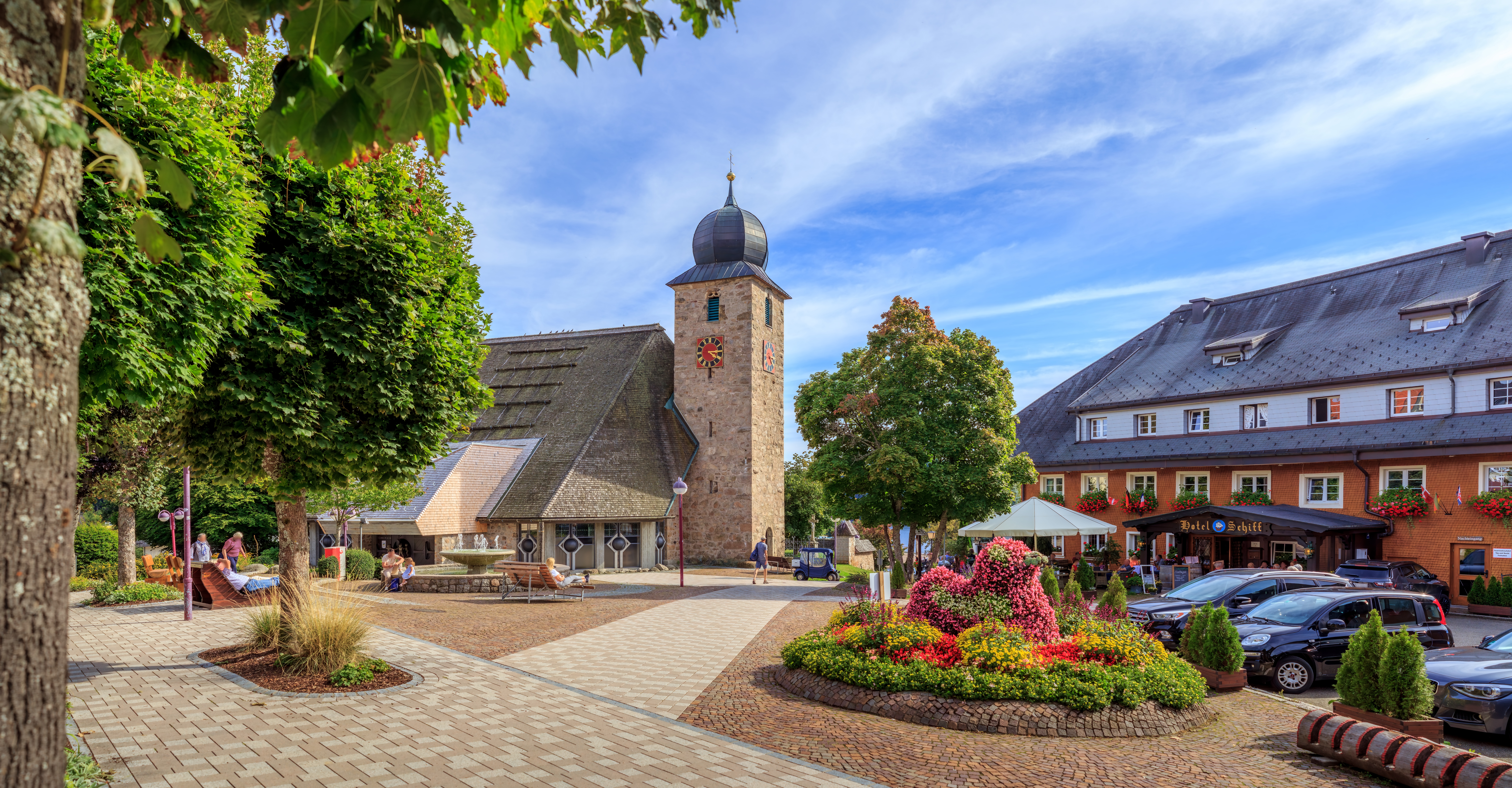
St. Nicholas Church

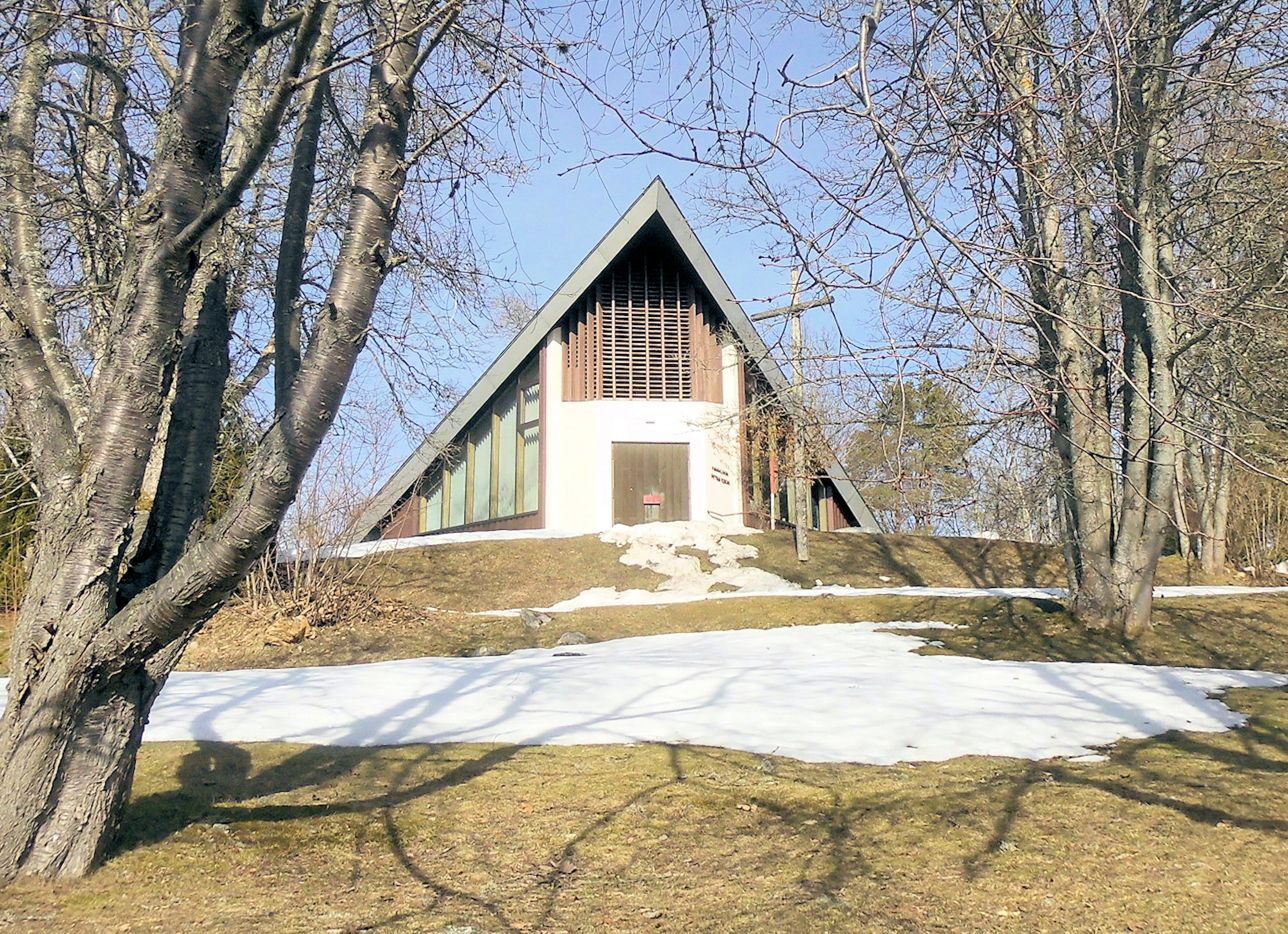
Petruskirche

St. Nicholas Church, built in 1275, is located just a few steps away from Schluchsee train station. Its roof is completely covered with wooden shingles. The interior was designed by Breisach sculptor Helmut Lutz.

=== Regular events ===
Every year on the Sunday of the first weekend in May, the Schluchsee Run takes place, an approximately 18 km long run around Lake Schluchsee. On the Saturday of the first weekend in May, the Schluchsee Nordic Walking Day starts with two routes of 18 km and 11 km respectively.

At the end of July, the Schluchsee Triathlon is held annually as the final event of the Baden-Württemberg Triathlon League. This involves a 1,500-meter swim in Lake Schluchsee, followed by a 40-kilometer bike ride and a final 10-kilometer run.

Local ski races are held every winter at the Fischbach ski lift.

== Notable people ==
=== Sons and daughters of the community ===
- Johann Baptist Eiselin (1637–1693), Benedictine monk and historian, born in Dresselbach
- Joseph Hörr (1732–1785), sculptor, born in Blasiwald-Althütte
- Joseph Muchenberger (1791–1863), bell founder, born in Blasiwald
- Pius Muchenberger (1814–1865), bell founder, born in Blasiwald
- Benjamin Muchenberger (1823–1876), bell founder, born in Blasiwald, moved his foundry to Wehr in 1872
- Toni Merz (1895–1966), born in Schönenbach, painter
- Otto Hitzfeld (1898–1990), regimental commander of Infantry Regiment 213 of the 73rd Infantry Division (Wehrmacht) (Wehrmacht)
- Georg Herbstritt (born 1965), historian
- Julien Chaim Soussan (born 1968), rabbi of the Jewish community in Frankfurt

=== Other notable people with connections to the town ===
- August Hirt (1898–1945), SS doctor, committed suicide in Schönenbach, a district of Schluchsee
- Thomas Rapsilber (1966–2002), ice hockey goalkeeper, drowned while fishing at night in Schluchsee
