= Hotzenwald =

Region of the Black Forest in southwest Germany

Coordinates: 47°39′N 8°02′E

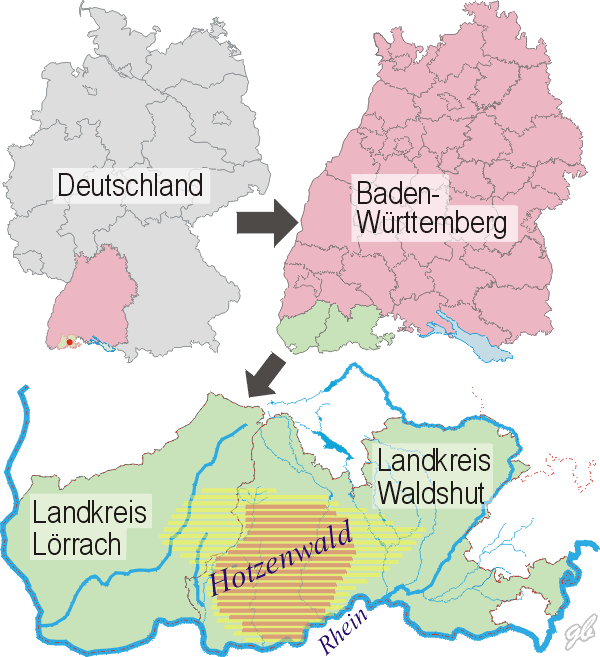
Location
Hotzenwald region - narrower and wider definitions highlighted
State:	Baden-Württemberg
Counties:	Waldshut, Lörrach
Region:	Hotzenwald

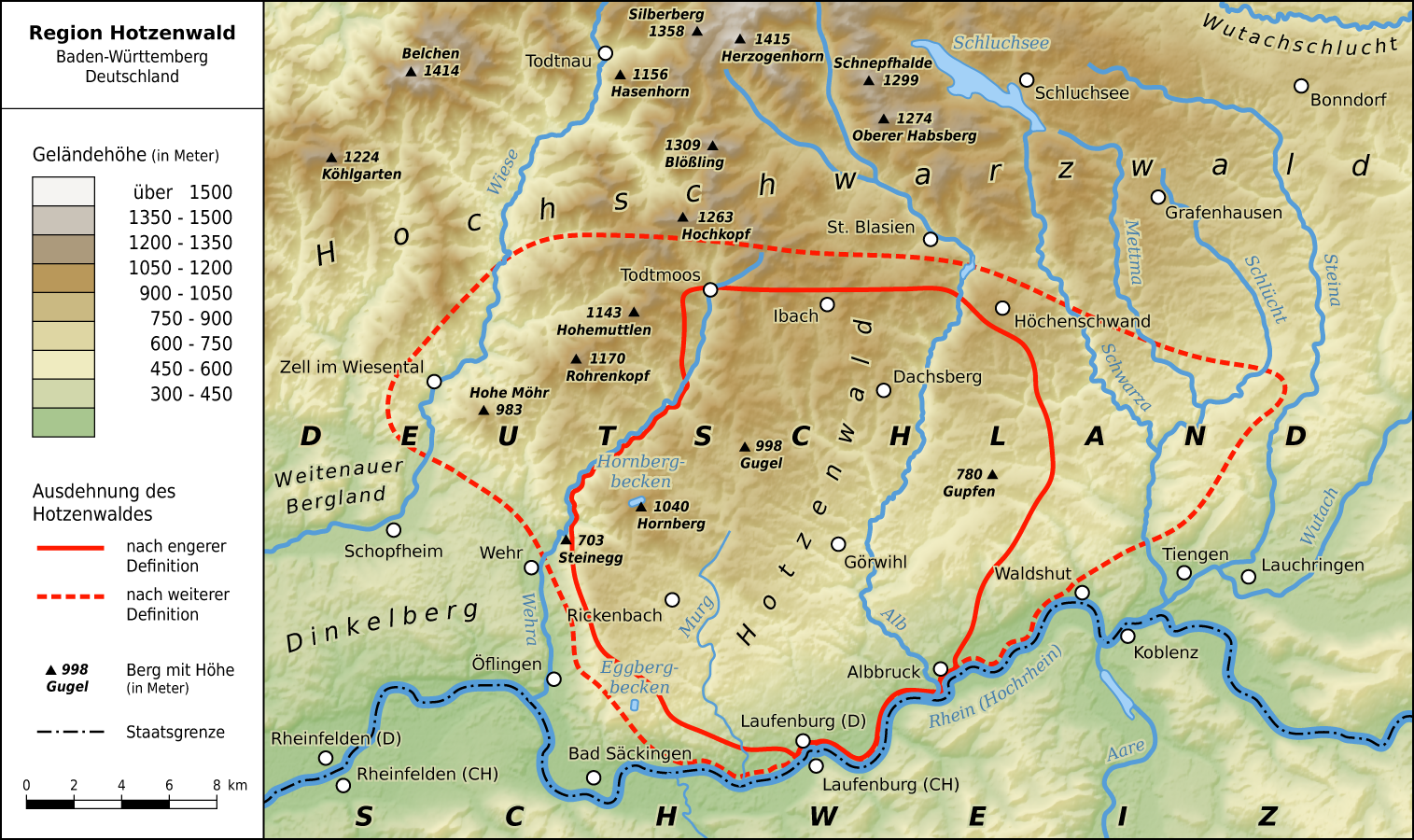
Topographic map of the Hotzenwald

The Hotzenwald (German pronunciation: [ˈhɔt͡sn̩ˌvalt]) is a landscape and region in the Southern Black Forest in the county of Waldshut. Its headquarters was the Waldvogteiamt.

== Location and topography ==
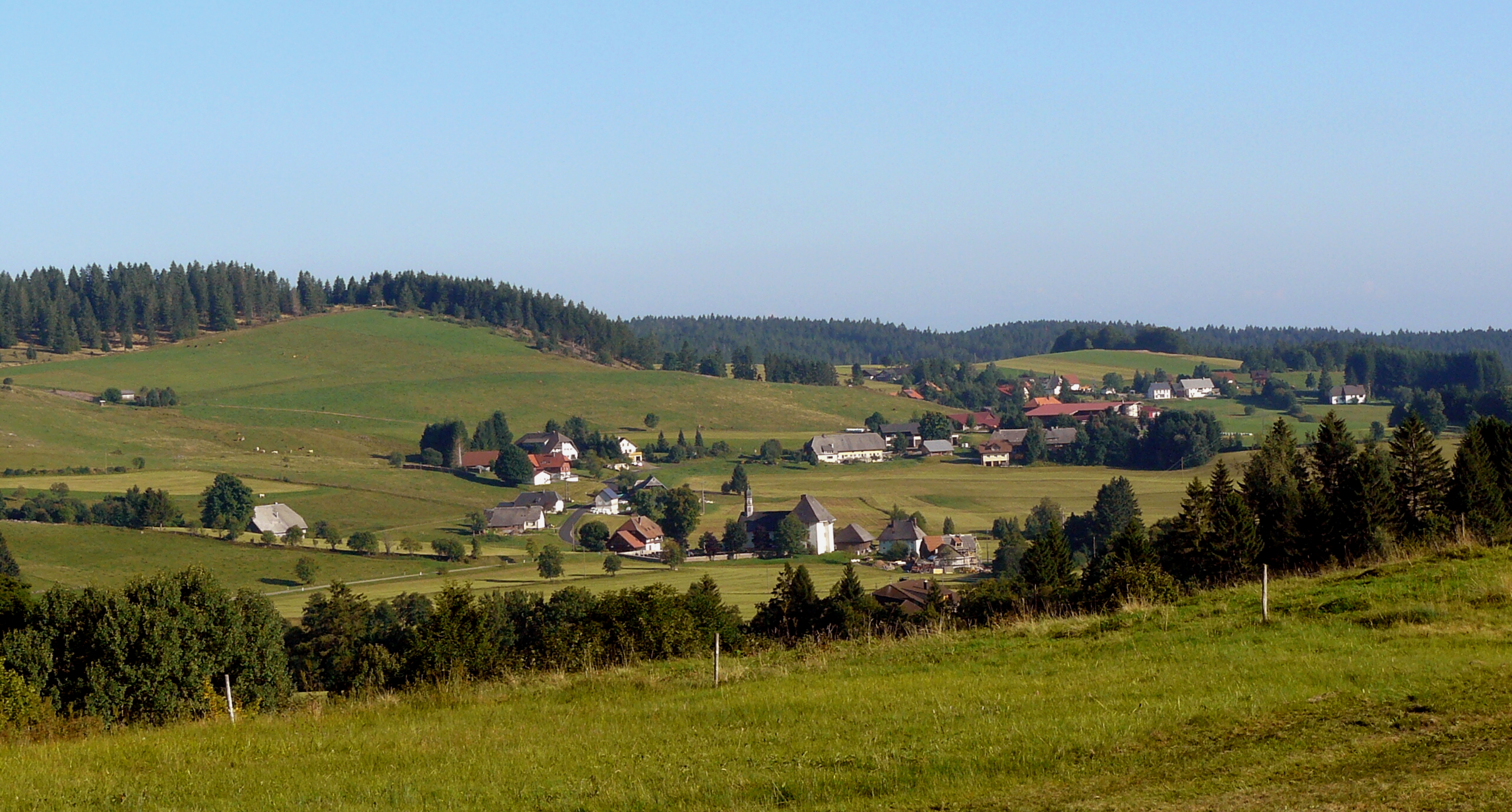
Hotzenwald landscape near Ibach

The region of Hotzenwald is not precisely defined in the records. In a narrower sense the Hotzenwald is the southernmost region of the Southern Black Forest, bounded in the west roughly by the Wehra, in the north approximately by the upper reaches of the Alb River near St. Blasien, in the east by the hill ridge between the Alb and Schlücht rivers, and in the south by the High Rhine and Klettgau rivers. This definition of the Hotzenwald more or less covers the same area as the territory of the former County of Hauenstein.

In a wider sense, other regions may be counted as part of the Hotzenwald that were linked to St. Blaise Abbey or the County of Hauenstein, both of which were historically important in the Southern Black Forest. These additional areas include, for example, the parish of Gersbach (Schopfheim), which was first mentioned in 1166 by the gift of a church to St Blaise Abbey. This parish lies immediately northwest of the Wehra. Others include the regions in the northwest as far as the middle and upper reaches of the Wiese river and in the east to the hill ridge between Schlücht and Steina rivers.

Whichever definition is used, the region mainly covers the central and high areas of the Southern Black Forest. It climbs rapidly from the level of the High Rhine (about 300 m above sea level (NN)) up to heights of 500 to over 1,000 m above NN across the majority of the area. The region drops from the summits of the Southern Black Forest in the north to the High Rhine in the south and is characterised by sunny plateaux and high valleys.

The rivers in the Hotzenwald generally form high valleys in their upper reaches and cut deeply into the basement of the Black Forest rocks in their lower reaches. They follow the downslope of the Southern Black Forest from north to south before emptying into the Rhine as right-hand tributaries. The main rivers in the Hotzenwald region, from west to east, are the Wiese, Wehra, Murg, Alb, and Schlücht.

The parishes in the heart of the region are Rickenbach, Herrischried, Dachsberg and Görwihl.

== Geology ==
=== Basement ===
The oldest rocks occurring in the Hotzenwald are gneisses and migmatites, which were formed in the Palaeozoic era. The largest part of the Hotzenwald is the granite countryside between Bernau and Bad Säckingen. The granite rocks that occur here are, according to research, up to 335 million years old. Other elements of the terrain are granite porphyry and lamprophyre. Near Laufenburg, the Kleiner Laufen rapids broke through the basement; today they are impounded.

=== Platform ===
In the eastern and southeastern Hotzenwald platform rocks cover the basement. According to field research in the area of Waldshut/Dogern this layer of bunter sandstone is an average of 15 metres thick and divided into three elements: the upper stratum of 8 metre thick Röt clays; beneath it a roughly 5 metre thick sandstone layer mixed with carnelian (the Carnelian horizon); and, at the bottom, above the basement, a roughly 2.5-metre-thick stratum of Mühl sandstone.

=== Glaciers ===
During the Würm glaciation the Alb valley glacier covered the Hotzenwald from the north to just before Görwihl. The extent of the Black Forest Glacier of the Riß glaciation is no longer precisely known today, but it appears to have extended from the north as well as far as Hottingen. The finds from the Alpine gravels of the Riß ice age indicate that the glacier flowed from the Alps to a point north of Waldshut-Tiengen. A confluence of the Black Forest Glacier and the Alpine Glacier is highly unlikely to have taken place.

== Vegetation ==
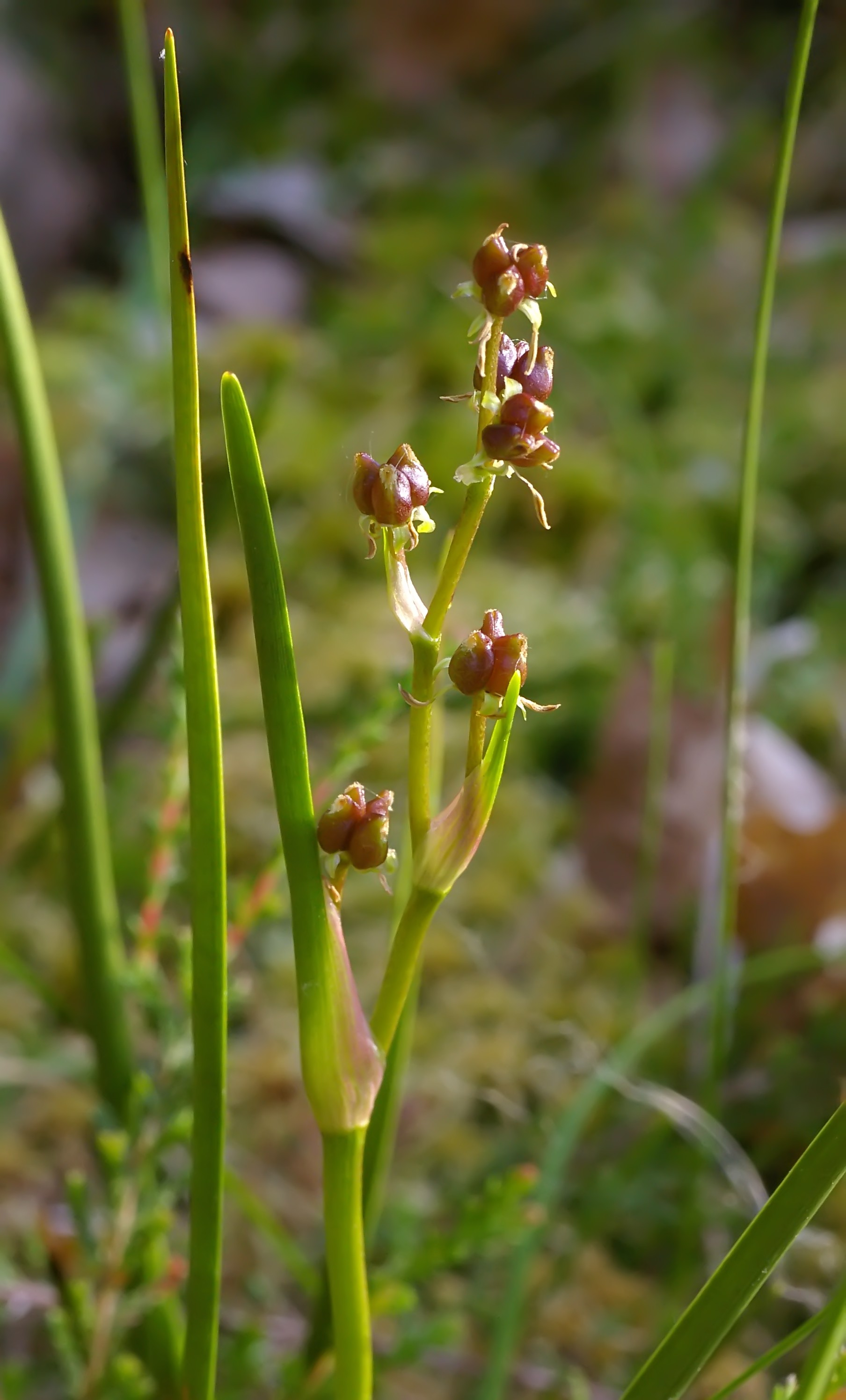
Blumenbinse (Scheuchzeria palustris)

After the ice age the Hotzenwald region experienced a tundra climate. There is evidence of beech being the dominant species of tree up to 600 B. C.. In addition, grain pollen, which dates to a similar period, is an indication of the first settlement of the Hotzenwald. Around 1,000 A. D. spruce superseded beech as the predominant tree species.

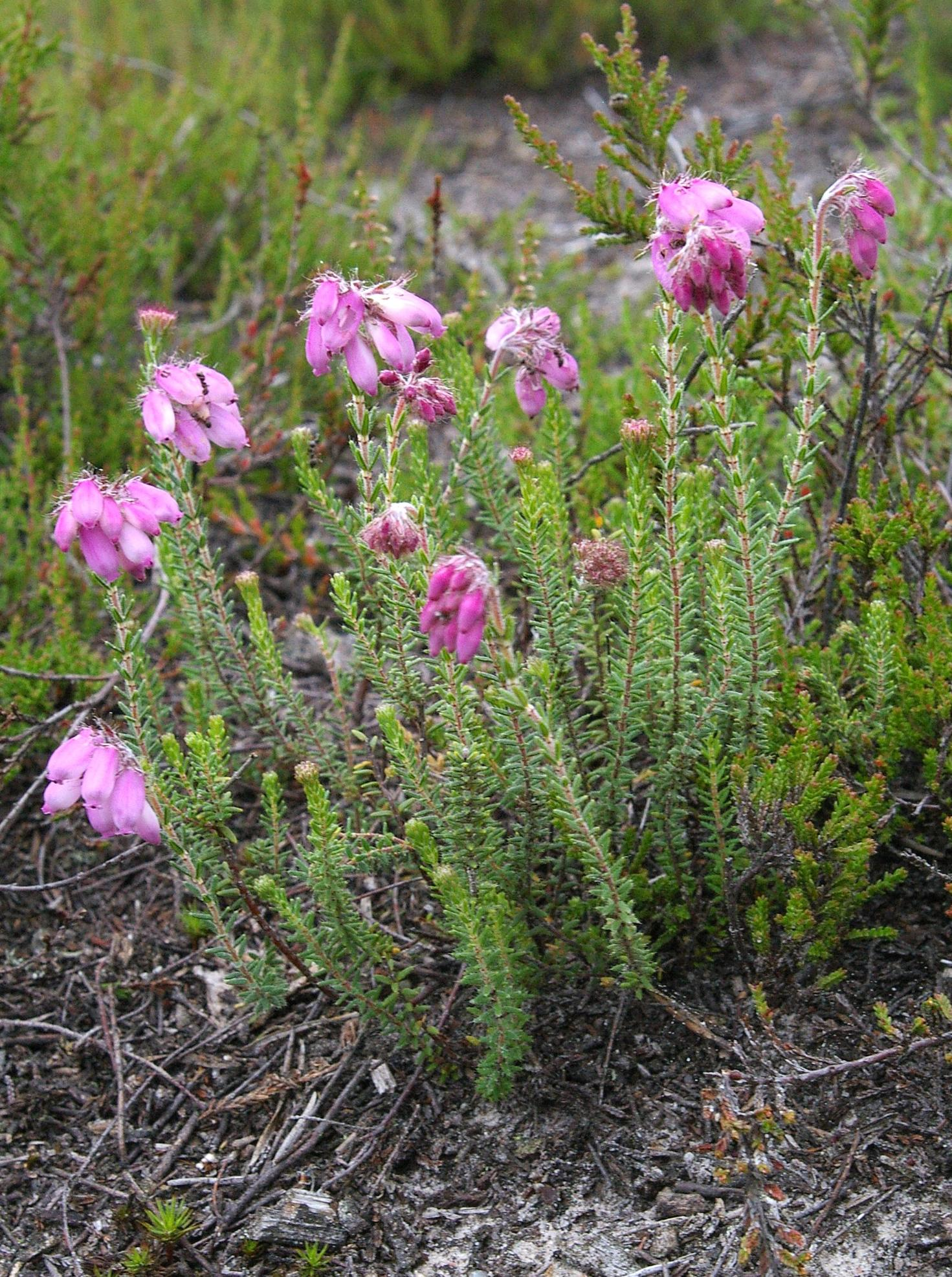
Glockenheide (Erica tetralix)

The raised bogs (Hochmoore) and transitional bogs (Übergangsmoore) especially in the Ibach/Dachsberg area, as a relic of the ice age, are home to a rich variety of species otherwise rare in the Black Forest such as bog-rosemary, mud sedge and fewflower sedge, rannoch-rush, alpine bulrush, white beak-sedge or purple coltsfoot. The European Arctic starflower has a strong presence in the Hotzenwald, which is also the only place in the whole of South Germany where the cross-leaved heath occurs naturally. Especially in the first half of the 20th century, the forestry industry's attempts at drainage drastically reduced the number of bogs. As a result, several bogs in the Hotzenwald were declared as nature reserves; in 1998 there were 10 of them. In addition, attempts have been made to regenerated some of the old bogs.

The forests in the Ibach/Dachsberg area and the Upper Forest (Oberwald) consist mainly of firs, beech and spruce. In the poorly drained hollows these are interrupted by bogs or spruce woods. In the second half of the 20th century, several areas of highland pasture were turned into forests. Likewise during this period, reforestation of the steep heads of the valleys, mountainsides and unused valley grasslands was begun. By contrast, the terraced slopes of the outer forests were largely cleared.

On the high pastures the winged greenweed plays an important role.

== Literature ==
- Karl Beck: Die Chronik vom Höchenschwander Berg. 2nd edn., Edition Isele, Eggingen, 1990, pp. 105ff, [ISBN unspecified].
- Cornelia Bischoff; Landesanstalt für Umweltschutz Baden-Württemberg (publ.): Wälder, Weiden, Moore. Naturschutz and Landnutzung im Oberen Hotzenwald. Verlag Regionalkultur, Heidelberg, 2004, ISBN 978-3-89735-268-1.
- Otto Gruber: Deutsche Bauern- and Ackerbürgerhäuser. Eine bautechnische Quellenforschung zur Geschichte des deutschen Hauses. Braun, Karlsruhe, 1926.
- Heinrich Hansjakob: Die Salpeterer, eine politisch-religiöse Sekte auf dem südöstlichen Schwarzwald. Zimmermann, Waldshut, 1867.
- Günther Haselier: Geschichte des Hotzenwalds. Schauenburg, Lahr 1973 [ISBN unspecified].
- Wolfgang Hug: Im Hotzenwald – Kultur- and Naturführer. Schillinger, Freiburg 2001, ISBN 978-3-89155-266-7.
- Helge Körner (ed.): Der Hotzenwald. Beiträge zur Natur and Kultur einer landscape im Southern Black Forest. Lavori, Freiburg, 2003, ISBN 978-3-935737-44-9.
- Thomas Lehner (ed.): Die Salpeterer. "freie, keiner Obrigkeit untertane Leut' auf dem Hotzenwald". Wagenbach, Berlin, 1977, ISBN 3-8031-2036-5.
- Emil Müller-Ettikon: Die Salpeterer. Geschichte eines Freiheitskampfes auf dem südlichen Schwarzwald. Schillinger, Freiburg 1979, ISBN 3-921340-42-X.
- Rudolf Metz: Geologische Landeskunde des Hotzenwalds. Mit Exkursionen, besonders in dessen alten Bergbaugebieten. Schauenburg, Lahr, 1980, ISBN 3-7946-0174-2.
- Günther Reichelt: Quartäre Erscheinungen im Hotzenwald zwischen Wehra and Alb. Reports by the Naturforschenden Gesellschaft Freiburg. (dissertation), 1960

== Film ==
- Der rätselhafte Hotzenwald. Travel programme, Germany, 2009, 28 min., production: SWR, series: Fahr mal hin, first broadcast: 6 October 2009, contents by SWR
