= Petra Mathers =

German-American writer and illustrator (1945–2024)

- Born: Petra Tollens; March 25, 1945; Todtmoos, Baden, Germany
- Died: February 6, 2024 (aged 78); Astoria, Oregon, U.S.
- Occupations: Writer, illustrator
- Spouse(s): Eberhard Richter Michael Mathers (m. 1980)
- Writing career
- Genre: Picture books

Petra Mathers (née Tollens; March 25, 1945 – February 6, 2024) was a German-born American writer and illustrator of children's picture books.

== Life and work ==
Petra Mathers was born in Todtmoos, Waldshut in the Black Forest in Germany on March 25, 1945, at the end of the second World War. Instead of university, she opted for a three year apprenticeship in the book business. "Wanting to see the world", she and her husband came to the United States and settled in Portland, Oregon. Working first as a waitress, then in a children's bookstore, she started painting by making pictures for her son's room. In time she exhibited her work in galleries in Oregon and Washington. In 1983, she got her first job illustrating a children's book for Harper & Row, and in 1985 she wrote and illustrated the first book of her own. She illustrated over 40 books, 12 of which she also wrote.

Mathers lived in Astoria, Oregon with her husband, author and photographer Michael Mathers, whom she married in 1980. Petra and Michael died by suicide at their home on February 6, 2024. She was 78.

== Style ==
Mathers was a self-taught artist and has a very distinct artistic style. Critic H. Nichols B. Clark describes her formal aesthetic, explaining that Mathers "[creates] simplified forms that comprise flat shapes. She assembles a carefully articulated formal arrangement whose visual dynamics are as integral to the production as the pictorial narrative." Linnea Hendricks explains that Mathers' picturebooks "combine a flat, naive, folklike style with wit and a strong sense of design" and are "praised for their freshness, originality, subtlety, and genuine feeling."

== Awards and honors ==
Petra Mathers' work has earned much acclaim, including the following accolades:

- 1986—New York Times Best Illustrated Children's Book of the Year for Molly's New Washing Machine (by Laura Geringer).
- 1988—New York Times Best Illustrated Children's Book of the Year for Theodor and Mr. Balbini.
- 1990—New York Times Best Illustrated Children's Book of the Year for I'm Flying (by Alan Wade).
- 1991—Boston Globe-Horn Book Award for Sophie and Lou.
- 1995—Society of Illustrators Silver Medal: for Kisses from Rosa.
- 1999—New York Times Best Illustrated Children's Book of the Year for Lottie's New Friend.
- 1999—Boston Globe-Horn Book Honor Award for Illustration for Lottie's New Friend.
- 1999—Society of Illustrators Silver Medal for Lottie's New Friend.
