= Bernau im Schwarzwald =

- Municipality
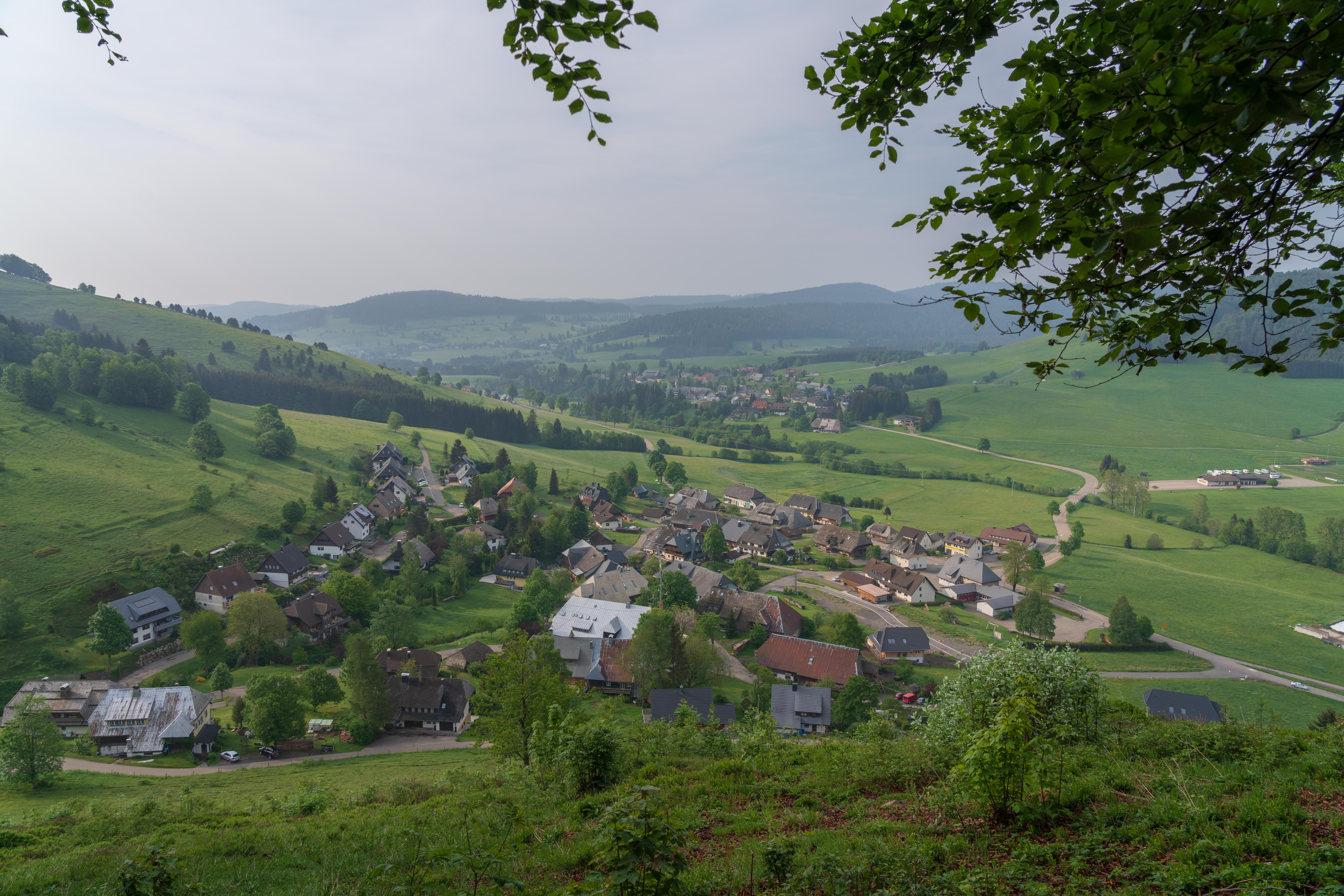
- Bernau im Schwarzwald

- Coat of arms

- Location of Bernau im Schwarzwald within Waldshut district
- Interactive map of Bernau im Schwarzwald
- Location within Germany Location within Baden-Württemberg
- Coordinates: 47°48′04″N 08°02′11″E
- Country: Germany
- State: Baden-Württemberg
- Admin. region: Freiburg
- District: Waldshut

Government
  - Mayor (2018–26): Alexander Schönemann

Area
  - Total: 38 km^{2} (15 sq mi)
- Elevation: 893 m (2,930 ft)

Population (2025-12-31)
  - Total: 1,805
  - Density: 48/km^{2} (120/sq mi)
- Time zone: UTC+01:00 (CET)
  - Summer (DST): UTC+02:00 (CEST)
- Postal codes: 79872
- Dialling codes: 07675
- Vehicle registration: WT
- Website: gemeinde.bernau-schwarzwald.de

Bernau im Schwarzwald (German pronunciation: [bɛʁˈnaʊ ʔɪm ˈʃvaʁtsvalt], lit. 'Bernau in the Black Forest') is a municipality in the district of Waldshut in Baden-Württemberg in Germany.

== Geography ==
Bernau is located in a high valley in the southern Black Forest, south of the Feldberg and west of the Schluchsee. Bernau includes the valley Bernauer Alb, a source stream of the Alb, and extends from 800 meters above sea level up to 1415 meters high.

=== Neighboring communities ===
The municipality is bordered to the north by the municipality of Feldberg, in the east by Menzenschwand and the city of St. Blasien, in the south of Ibach, in the southwest of Todtmoos and on the west by the city of Todtnau in the district of Lörrach.

=== Weather ===
The annual rainfall is 1919 mm. The driest month is September; most precipitation falls in December. In the wettest month, rain falls about 1.9 times more than the driest month. The temperatures are quite cool with −2.5 °C in January and 13.9 °C in July, and in the morning lower temperatures than on the Feldberg in Bernau are usually measured. The place is one of the snowiest of the Black Forest. In the winter of 2006 the snow was almost two meters high. Again in the winter of 2020-2021 snow was abundant starting December 1 and continuing for many weeks well into March.

Monthly average temperatures and precipitates for Bernau (928m) ^{[3]}

	January	February	March	April	May	June	July	August	September	October	November	December
Temperature (°C)	-2.5	-1.5	0.9	4.2	8.8	12.1	13.9	13.2	10.5	6.5	1.7	-1.8	O	5.5
Precipitation (mm)	196	170	155	125	154	157	153	145	110	150	195	208	Σ	1918

== History ==
The colonization of today's municipal area began in late 11th century with deforestation and construction of courts by lay brothers of the monastery of St. Blasien. The first mention was made in 1157 at the inauguration of a chapel in the district court. With the secularization of the monastery St. Blasien 1806, the centuries-old monastery rule while the membership ended on Front Austria, the place came to the newly created Grand Duchy of Baden.

1922 built the church together with the wooden goods works Präg GmbH in Präg the E-Werk Wacht, which then supplied the wood works and all residents of the community with electric energy. 1934 four independent municipalities of Bernauer valley, Bernau-Innerlehen (with Riggenbach and Schwendele), Hof, Bernau-Dorf with Goldbach and Bernau-Except feudal united (with the Imperial House, Altenrond, Oberlehen, Gass, Unterlehen and Weierle) to the community Bernau. Since then the town was essentially unchanged, using the Baden-Württemberg territorial reform in the 1970s away. The renaming in Bernau im Schwarzwald was carried out on 1 January 1999. ^{[4]}

== Politics ==
=== Council ===
The council has 10 members in Bernau. The local elections on 25 May 2014 led to the following official results. The turnout was 67.3% (2009: 70.8%). The council consists of the elected honorary councilors and the mayor as chairman. The mayor is entitled to vote in the municipal council.

Citizens for Bernau	41.8% - 4 seats,	2009: 4 seats
CDU	36.1% - 4 seats,	2009: 3 seats
CDU	22.1% - 2 seats,	2009: 3 seats

=== Mayor ===
Rolf Schmidt was elected in 2002 and reelected in 2010. Alexander Schönemann was elected as new mayor in 2018.

== Culture and sights ==
- Thoma Showroom
- Resenhof

=== Museums ===
- The Hans-Thoma-Kunstmuseum exhibits paintings, graphics and other works and documents by Hans Thoma. In addition, the museum presents works of the respective Hans-Thoma-Prizewinner and of Karl Hauptmann.
- The museum Resenhof, set in a 1789 built high black forest farm, provides an insight into the life and work of people in the Bernauer Hochtal of the 19th century.

=== Sports ===
Nearly 100 kilometers of hiking trails open up the 900 meter high and eight kilometers long high valley for hikers. The friends of Nordic walking are offered designated routes and mountain bikers will find routes almost any level of difficulty. A flight school offers courses in paragliding.

Five ski lifts and a ski school professional of the German Ski Instructors' Association are the friends of alpine sportsavailable. For cross-country skiers there are several cross-country ski trails, depending on snow conditions up to 32 kilometers in length.

In place of the football club FC Bernau that Skizunft SZ Bernau and Tennis Club TC Bernau exist. In winter, in Bernau and Todtmoos regularly sled dog races with international participation.

== Economy and infrastructure ==
Traditionally, lived Bernauer of the country - and forestry and wood processing. Especially the wood carving has a long tradition. Manufactured were mainly in the winter months at first commodities like cooking spoons, wooden vessels, chip baskets and boxes. Later, wooden toys and craft items were added.

The sometimes extreme and erosion-prone hillsides made agriculture difficult, low yields and virtually non-mechanized. So already sat early in the 1930s, the structural transformation a, which after the Second World War strengthened continued - away from agriculture and towards tourism. The snow-sure location of the Black Forest allows almost year-round tourist season. 1960 was the first ski lift put into operation today (2006) there are six lifts, including two floodlit and four with snowmaking facilities.

== Notable people ==
- Hans Thoma (1839-1924), painter and graphic artist, was born in Oberlehen, grew up there and in 1909 was appointed an honorary citizen of Bernau.
- Ernst Koepfer (1878-1954), ski pioneer and founder of the company Karl Köpfer sons ^{[5]}
