= Waldshut =

Waldshut may refer to:

- Waldshut (district), a county in Baden-Württemberg, Germany
- Waldshut-Tiengen, a town in Baden-Württemberg, Germany
