= Feldberg, Baden-Württemberg =

Feldberg
- Municipality
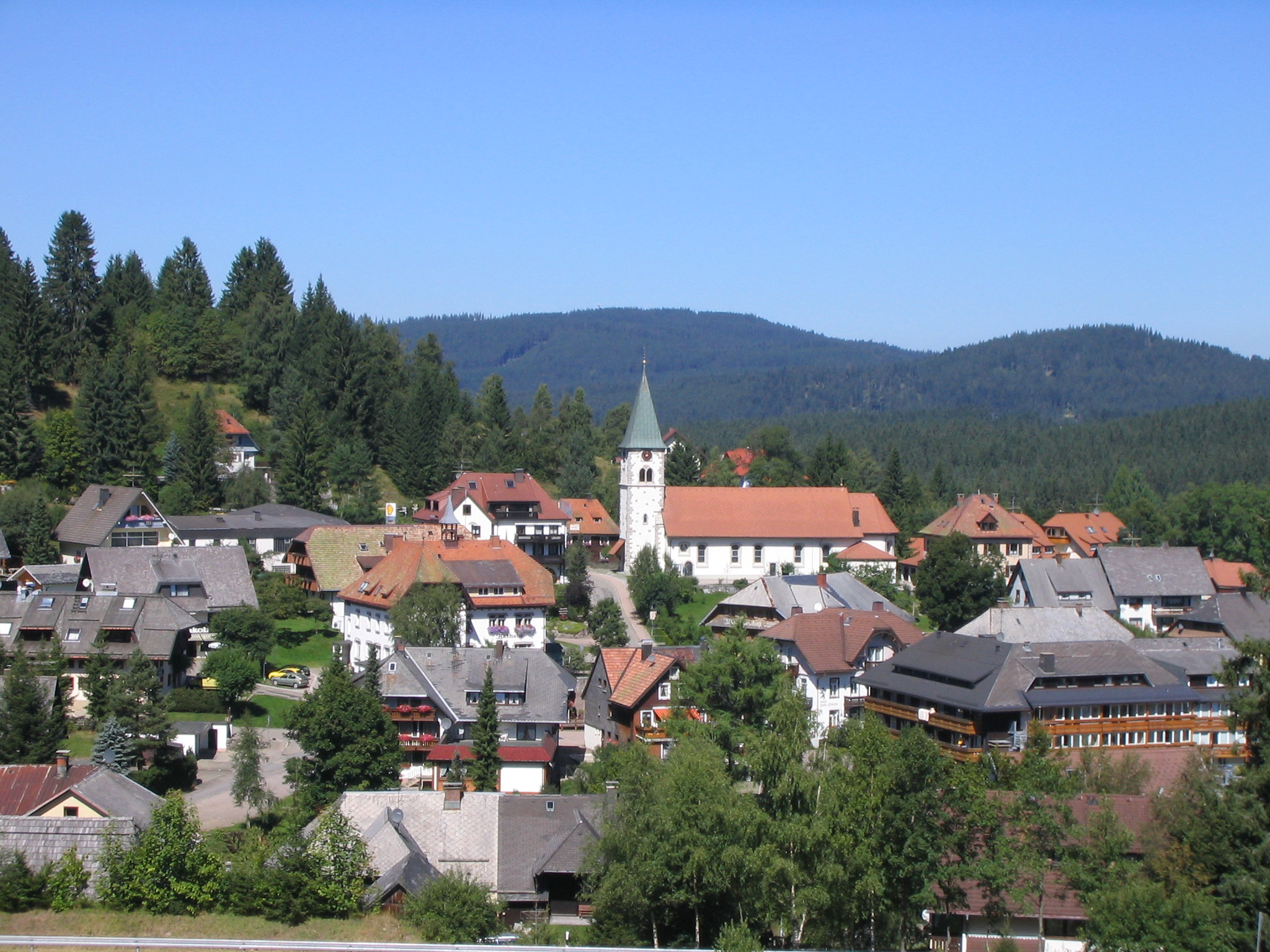
- Center of Altglashütten in August 2015

- Coat of arms

- Location of Feldberg within Breisgau-Hochschwarzwald district
- Interactive map of Feldberg
- Location within Germany Location within Baden-Württemberg
- Coordinates: 47°51′22″N 8°6′42″E
- Country: Germany
- State: Baden-Württemberg
- Admin. region: Freiburg
- District: Breisgau-Hochschwarzwald

Government
  - Mayor (2019–27): Johannes Albrecht

Area
  - Total: 24.97 km^{2} (9.64 sq mi)
- Elevation: 1,277 m (4,190 ft)

Population (2025-12-31)
  - Total: 1,968
  - Density: 78.81/km^{2} (204.1/sq mi)
- Time zone: UTC+01:00 (CET)
  - Summer (DST): UTC+02:00 (CEST)
- Postal codes: 79868
- Dialling codes: 07676 / 07655
- Vehicle registration: FR
- Website: www.feldberg-schwarzwald.de

Feldberg (German pronunciation: [ˈfɛltˌbɛʁk]) is a municipality in the district of Breisgau-Hochschwarzwald in Baden-Württemberg in southern Germany. It is located near the Feldberg, the highest summit in Baden-Württemberg. It comprises the settlements of Altglashütten, Neuglashütten, Falkau, Bärental, and Feldberg. At an elevation of 1,277 metres or 4,190 feet, the last is considered the highest village in Germany.

== History ==
The first mention of Feldberg was made in 983, but there was a separate municipality with the same name until 1 January 1939, when isolated pastures were combined with the municipality Bärental (970 m above sea level). They were previously owned by the municipalities Bernau, Brandenberg, Hinterzarten, Menzenschwand, St. William, Todtnau and Zastler. What was left of Brandenberg after incorporation to Feldberg became a new district in Todtnau.

== Geography ==
The Feldberg municipality has the slogan "The highest in the Black Forest" and is located in the Southern Black Forest Nature Park at the Feldberg Pass. It is located between Wiesental (to the south) and Gutachtal (to the north). The largest section of the municipality is the "Falkau" area, where the town hall is located.

=== Community structure ===
The current Feldberg municipality includes the three former municipalities of Feldberg, Altglashütten, and Falkau and consists of 30 villages, sections, farms, and cottages and houses.

=== Climate ===
Feldberg has a subalpine climate (Köppen: Dfc; Trewartha: Eolo) due to its high altitude with short, cool summers and long, cold winters. Precipitation is very high and frequent year round.

The Feldberg weather station has recorded the following extreme values:

- Its highest temperature was 27.4 °C (81.3 °F) on 31 July 1983.
- Its lowest temperature was −30.7 °C (−23.3 °F) on 10 February 1956.
- Its greatest annual precipitation was 2,517.6 mm (99.12 in) in 1965.
- Its least annual precipitation was 1,095.5 mm (43.13 in) in 2009.
- The longest annual sunshine was 2103.5 hours in 2003.
- The shortest annual sunshine was 1317.9 hours in 1977.

Climate data for Feldberg Mountain WMO ID: 10908; coordinates 47°52′30″N 8°0′14″E; elevation: 1,489.6 m (4,887 ft); 1991–2020 normals, extremes 1931–present
Month	Jan	Feb	Mar	Apr	May	Jun	Jul	Aug	Sep	Oct	Nov	Dec	Year
Record high °C (°F)	12.9 (55.2)	16.7 (62.1)	15.1 (59.2)	21.1 (70.0)	22.9 (73.2)	27.0 (80.6)	27.4 (81.3)	26.4 (79.5)	24.6 (76.3)	21.2 (70.2)	18.1 (64.6)	13.9 (57.0)	27.4 (81.3)
Mean maximum °C (°F)	7.5 (45.5)	8.4 (47.1)	10.6 (51.1)	14.0 (57.2)	18.3 (64.9)	21.7 (71.1)	22.9 (73.2)	22.4 (72.3)	18.5 (65.3)	16.2 (61.2)	12.4 (54.3)	8.9 (48.0)	24.0 (75.2)
Mean daily maximum °C (°F)	0.1 (32.2)	−0.3 (31.5)	2.2 (36.0)	5.6 (42.1)	9.7 (49.5)	13.2 (55.8)	15.2 (59.4)	15.2 (59.4)	11.2 (52.2)	8.0 (46.4)	3.6 (38.5)	0.9 (33.6)	7.1 (44.8)
Daily mean °C (°F)	−2.4 (27.7)	−2.8 (27.0)	−0.4 (31.3)	2.8 (37.0)	6.7 (44.1)	10.2 (50.4)	12.2 (54.0)	12.3 (54.1)	8.5 (47.3)	5.4 (41.7)	1.1 (34.0)	−1.6 (29.1)	4.3 (39.7)
Mean daily minimum °C (°F)	−4.7 (23.5)	−5.1 (22.8)	−2.8 (27.0)	0.2 (32.4)	4.0 (39.2)	7.4 (45.3)	9.5 (49.1)	9.8 (49.6)	6.2 (43.2)	3.1 (37.6)	−1.1 (30.0)	−3.8 (25.2)	1.9 (35.4)
Mean minimum °C (°F)	−12.3 (9.9)	−12.8 (9.0)	−10.0 (14.0)	−7.2 (19.0)	−2.4 (27.7)	0.9 (33.6)	3.8 (38.8)	3.8 (38.8)	0.2 (32.4)	−4.2 (24.4)	−8.2 (17.2)	−11.8 (10.8)	−15.7 (3.7)
Record low °C (°F)	−25.7 (−14.3)	−30.7 (−23.3)	−20.3 (−4.5)	−13.7 (7.3)	−8.3 (17.1)	−3.5 (25.7)	−1.7 (28.9)	−1.1 (30.0)	−5.3 (22.5)	−11.1 (12.0)	−15.1 (4.8)	−23.0 (−9.4)	−30.7 (−23.3)
Average precipitation mm (inches)	119.3 (4.70)	88.7 (3.49)	102.4 (4.03)	101.7 (4.00)	165.2 (6.50)	150.0 (5.91)	155.4 (6.12)	141.8 (5.58)	131.4 (5.17)	153.6 (6.05)	134.0 (5.28)	150.1 (5.91)	1,589.4 (62.57)
Average extreme snow depth cm (inches)	64.0 (25.2)	88.6 (34.9)	94.6 (37.2)	72.2 (28.4)	13.2 (5.2)	1.5 (0.6)	0 (0)	0 (0)	3.4 (1.3)	9.7 (3.8)	24.9 (9.8)	48.9 (19.3)	109.0 (42.9)
Average precipitation days (≥ 0.1 mm)	18.6	17.4	18.2	17.1	18.9	17.4	16.7	17.0	15.3	17.5	18.0	20.2	213.4
Average snowy days (≥ 1.0 cm)	29.7	28.2	30.2	22.5	3.8	0.4	0	0	0.8	5.4	17.3	28.1	168.5
Average relative humidity (%)	80.8	81.7	82.5	80.1	81.7	82.6	81.0	81.2	84.7	82.5	81.8	81.7	82.0
Mean monthly sunshine hours	88.9	98.4	133.7	157.5	171.6	183.5	206.9	197.7	149.9	121.3	86.4	74.8	1,654.5
Source 1: NOAA
Source 2: Deutscher Wetterdienst / SKlima.de

== Politics ==
=== Local council ===
The general election on 25 May 2014 resulted in the following allocation of seats within the local council:

Political Party	Number of Seats
The Feldberg List	4 seats
Free Voters	3 seats (-1)
Citizen List Feldberg	3 seats

=== Administration ===
There is an inter-municipality agreement with the neighbouring Schluchsee municipality.

=== Coat of arms ===
In 1974, the ministry of the interior granted Dr. Alfred Simon permission to design the following crest: a red plate head holding two crossed silver snowshoes lies above a split silver and blue area. The blue section, on the left, holds three silver discs, and the silver section, on the right, holds a green fir tree.

The founder municipalities Feldberg, Bärental, and Altglashütten are represented by the three primary colours red, white, and blue. The blue also most likely represents the connection to the former House of Fürstenberg (Swabia). The meaning of the three discs leaves room for speculation. They are either reminiscent of glass spheres and glaziers or of the three lakes that meet within the boundary of Feldberg: Titisee, Windgfällweiher und Schluchsee. They could also symbolize the unity of the three communities.

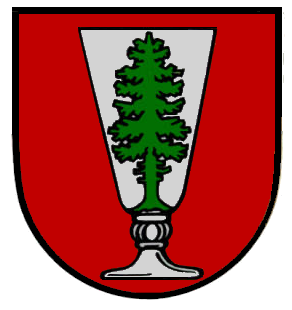
Altglashütten

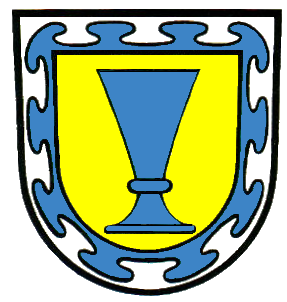
Neuglashütten

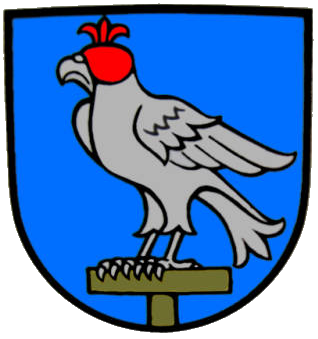
Falkau

Coat of arms of the former municipalities

== Twin towns ==
Feldberg has a sister city agreement with the municipality of La Clusaz in France im Département Haute-Savoie, which is, like Feldberg, a winter sport centre.

== Transport ==
Federal highways 500 and 317 intersect in Bärental. The construction of the Dreiseenbahn, which runs from Titisee to Seebrugg, was completed in 1926 and in Bärental, it is Germany's highest railway on a standard gauge track.

== Education ==
Altglashütten has a primary school and a kindergarten.

== Sightseeing ==
=== Nature monuments ===
The sponsoring association of the Southern Black Forest Nature Park has its seat in Feldberg.

- Feldsee, a tarn excavated by the Feldberg glacier below the summit
- Zastler Loch, formed as the Feldberg glacier excavated valleys in the former village of Zastler
- Bärhalde, a botanically interesting forest summit with rocks and small moors
- Rotmeer, a swampy area
- Seebach waterfall, near the town of Behabühl
- Falkau waterfall in Haslach
- Headwaters of the Wiese, Alb (Upper Rhine), and Wutach rivers

== Culture ==
The Lawrence of Rome festival occurs yearly on the Feldberg in addition to the nearby annual Altglashütten town festival.

== Notable people ==
- August Euler (1868–1957), pioneer aviator, lived in a house on the Seebuck mountain until his death

== Literature ==
- August Vetter: Feldberg im Schwarzwald, Selbstverlag der Gemeinde Feldberg (Schwarzwald), 1982/1996
