= Bonndorf im Schwarzwald =

- Town
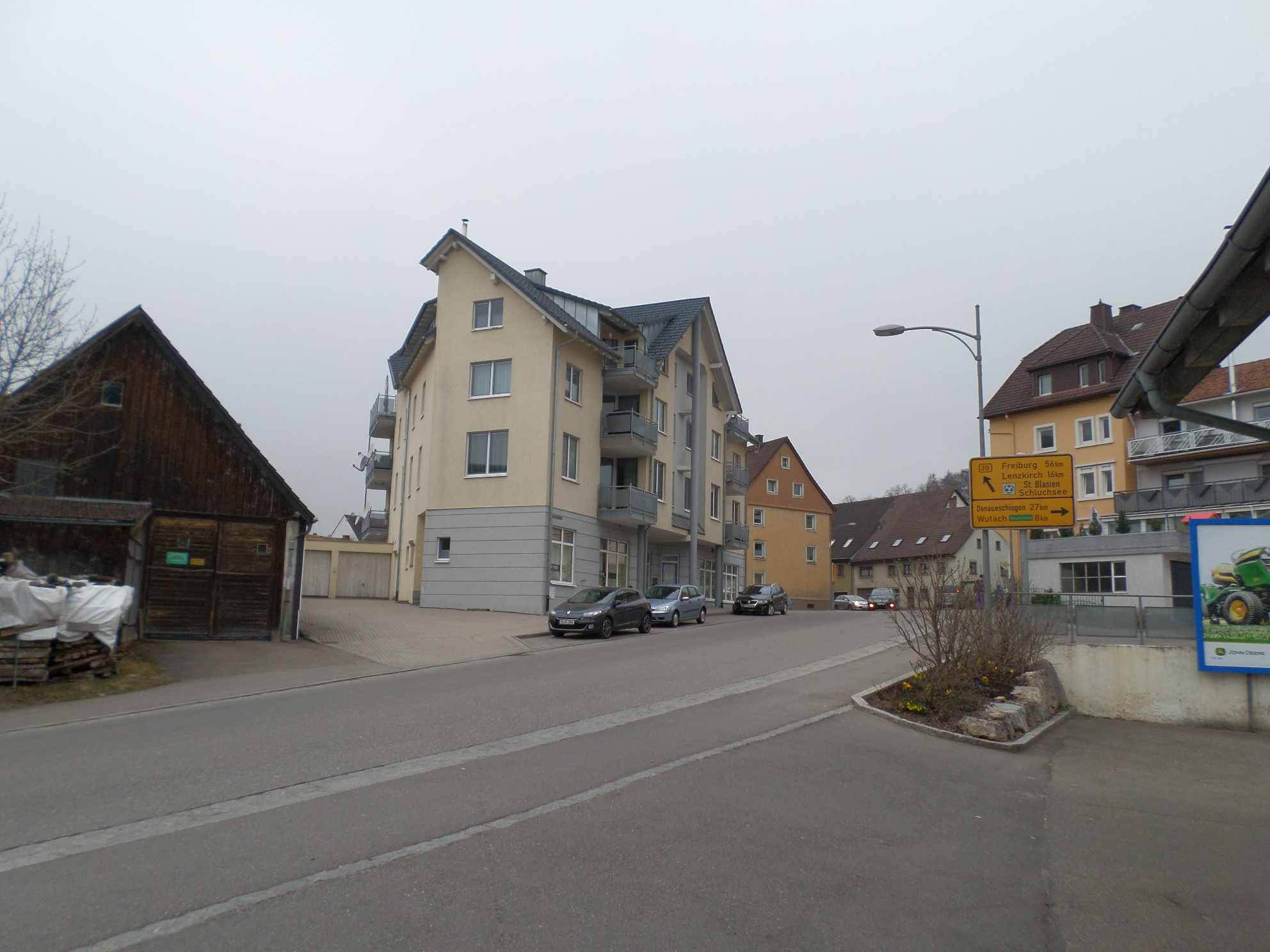

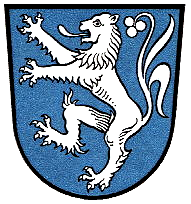
- Coat of arms

- Location of Bonndorf im Schwarzwald within Waldshut district
- Interactive map of Bonndorf im Schwarzwald
- Location within Germany Location within Baden-Württemberg
- Coordinates: 47°49′10″N 08°20′35″E
- Country: Germany
- State: Baden-Württemberg
- Admin. region: Freiburg
- District: Waldshut
- Subdivisions: 8 Ortsteile

Government
  - Mayor (2021–29): Marlon Jost

Area
  - Total: 75.91 km^{2} (29.31 sq mi)
- Elevation: 845 m (2,772 ft)

Population (2025-12-31)
  - Total: 6,799
  - Density: 89.57/km^{2} (232.0/sq mi)
- Time zone: UTC+01:00 (CET)
  - Summer (DST): UTC+02:00 (CEST)
- Postal codes: 79844–79848
- Dialling codes: 07703
- Vehicle registration: WT
- Website: www.bonndorf.de

Bonndorf im Schwarzwald (German pronunciation: [ˈbɔndɔʁf ʔɪm ˈʃvaʁtsvalt], lit. 'Bonndorf in the Black Forest') is a town in the Waldshut district in Baden-Württemberg, Germany. It is situated in the southern Black Forest, 14 km southeast of Titisee-Neustadt.

It comprises the villages Boll, Brunnadern, Dillendorf, Ebnet, Gündelwangen, Holzschlag, Wellendingen and Wittlekofen. The town is well known for its Fastnacht festival held on the days before Ash Wednesday. Wellendingen has its frogs in the parade. Also in the town is a castle, the Japanese Gardens, and a dedicated museum to Fastnacht festivals in the area. In Boll is the Wutach Gorge which runs into the Rhine.

== Population ==
Historical population
Year	Pop.	±%
1855	1,212	—
1900	1,600	+32.0%
1950	2,100	+31.2%
1970	3,400	+61.9%
1980	5,364	+57.8%
2013	6,800	+26.8%
2015	6,836	+0.5%

== Mayors since 1945 ==
- 1945: Fritz Göggel
- August 1, 1945: Erwin Leser
- 1946–1957: Leo Speck
- 1958–1972: Oskar Stöckle
- 1973–1992: Peter Folkerts (1946-1992)
- 1992–2021: Michael Scharf (born 1964)
- since 2021: Marlon Jost

== Personalities ==
=== Born in Bonndorf ===
- Constantin Fehrenbach (1852-1926), politician (center), Reichskanzler 1920–1921

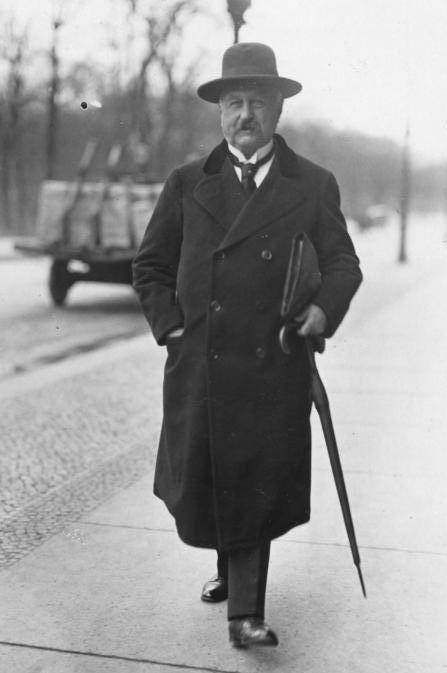
Constantin Fehrenbach

- Adolf Würth (1905-1997), Nazi racist theorist
- Clemens Binninger (born 1962), politician and member of Bundestag (CDU)

=== Lived in Bonndorf ===
- Ralf Dahrendorf, Baron Dahrendorf CFE (1929-2009), German-British sociologist, politician and publicist

== See also ==
- List of cities and towns in Germany
- St. Peter and Paul, Bonndorf im Schwarzwald
