= Ühlingen-Birkendorf =

- Municipality
- Coat of arms

- Location of Ühlingen-Birkendorf within Waldshut district
- Interactive map of Ühlingen-Birkendorf
- Location within Germany Location within Baden-Württemberg
- Coordinates: 47°43′10″N 08°19′05″E
- Country: Germany
- State: Baden-Württemberg
- Admin. region: Freiburg
- District: Waldshut

Government
  - Mayor (2020–28): Tobias Gantert

Area
  - Total: 77.07 km^{2} (29.76 sq mi)
- Elevation: 644 m (2,113 ft)

Population (2025-12-31)
  - Total: 5,286
  - Density: 68.59/km^{2} (177.6/sq mi)
- Time zone: UTC+01:00 (CET)
  - Summer (DST): UTC+02:00 (CEST)
- Postal codes: 79777
- Dialling codes: 07743, 07747
- Vehicle registration: WT
- Website: www.uehlingen-birkendorf.de

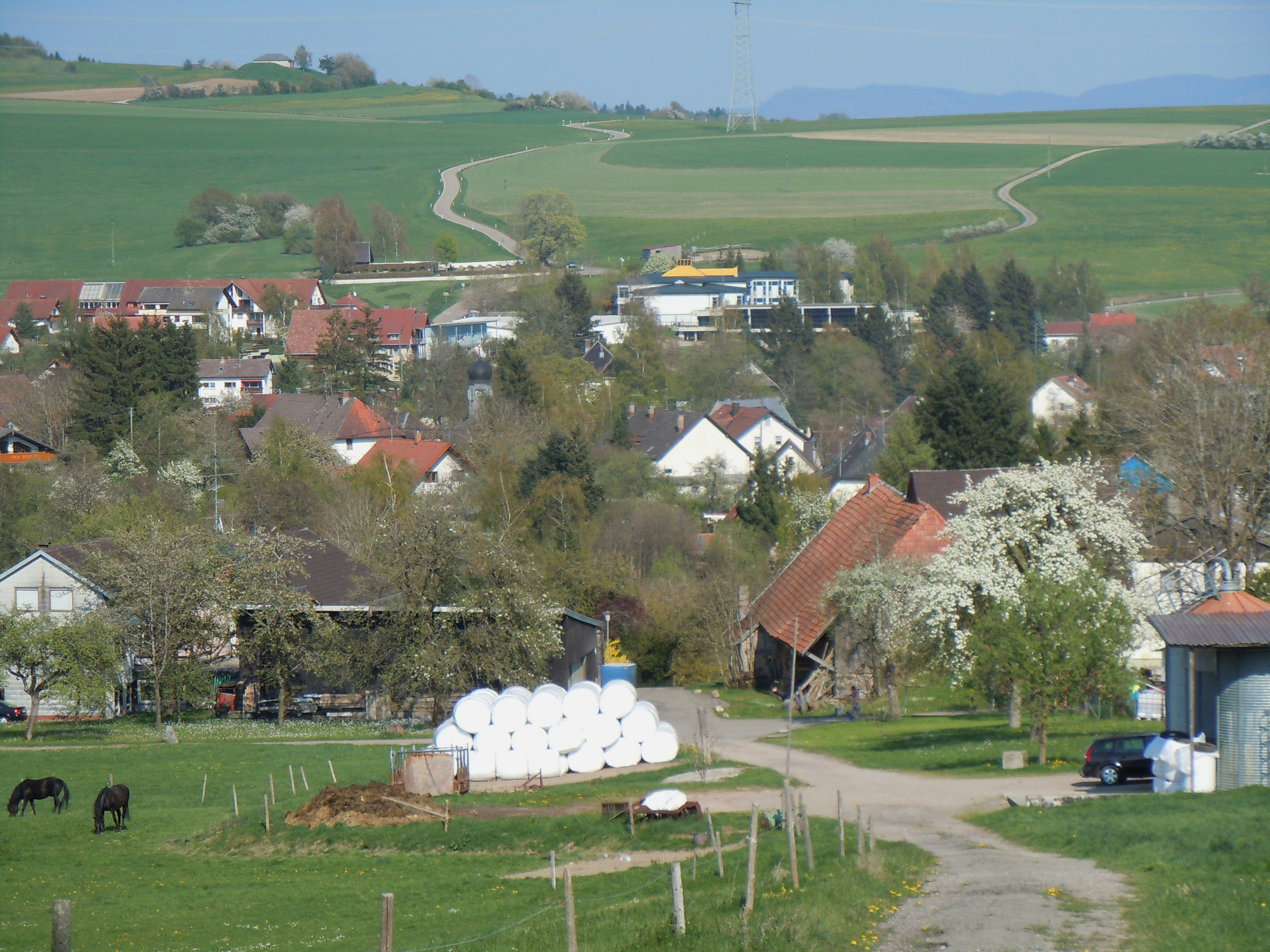
Ühlingen-Birkendorf

Ühlingen-Birkendorf (German pronunciation: [ˈyːlɪŋən ˈbɪʁkn̩dɔʁf]) is a municipality in the district of Waldshut in Baden-Württemberg in Germany.

== Notable people ==
- Karl Albiker (1878–1961), sculptor

== See also ==
- List of cities and towns in Germany
