= Höchenschwand =

- Municipality
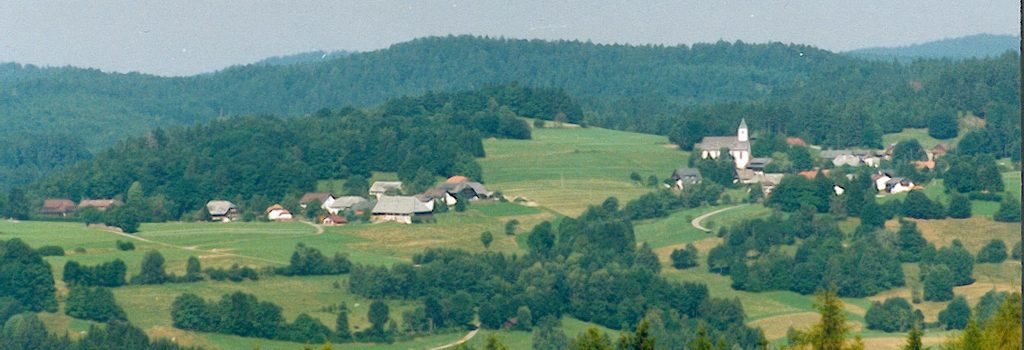

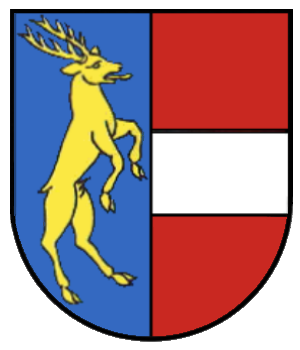
- Coat of arms

- Location of Höchenschwand within Waldshut district
- Interactive map of Höchenschwand
- Location within Germany Location within Baden-Württemberg
- Coordinates: 47°44′N 08°10′E
- Country: Germany
- State: Baden-Württemberg
- Admin. region: Freiburg
- District: Waldshut

Government
  - Mayor (2019–27): Sebastian Stiegeler

Area
  - Total: 29.56 km^{2} (11.41 sq mi)
- Elevation: 1,015 m (3,330 ft)

Population (2025-12-31)
  - Total: 2,567
  - Density: 86.84/km^{2} (224.9/sq mi)
- Time zone: UTC+01:00 (CET)
  - Summer (DST): UTC+02:00 (CEST)
- Postal codes: 79862
- Dialling codes: 07672, 07755
- Vehicle registration: WT
- Website: www.hoechenschwand.de

Höchenschwand (German pronunciation: [ˈhøːçn̩ʃvant]) is a municipality in the district of Waldshut in Baden-Württemberg in Germany.

Panoramic view (350°) from the Rothaus-Zäpfle-Tower nearby Höchenschwand

== See also ==
- List of cities and towns in Germany
