= Grafenhausen =

- Municipality
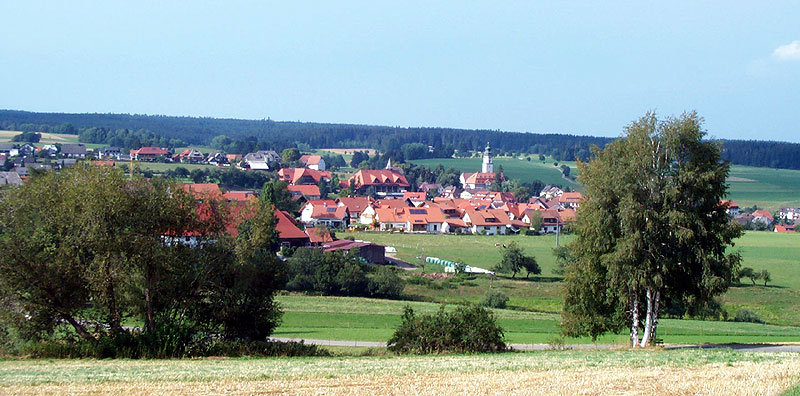
- Grafenhausen

- Coat of arms

- Location of Grafenhausen within Waldshut district
- Interactive map of Grafenhausen
- Location within Germany Location within Baden-Württemberg
- Coordinates: 47°46′27″N 08°15′45″E
- Country: Germany
- State: Baden-Württemberg
- Admin. region: Freiburg
- District: Waldshut

Government
  - Mayor (2018–26): Christian Behringer

Area
  - Total: 48.54 km^{2} (18.74 sq mi)
- Elevation: 895 m (2,936 ft)

Population (2025-12-31)
  - Total: 2,324
  - Density: 47.88/km^{2} (124.0/sq mi)
- Time zone: UTC+01:00 (CET)
  - Summer (DST): UTC+02:00 (CEST)
- Postal codes: 79865
- Dialling codes: 07748
- Vehicle registration: WT
- Website: www.grafenhausen.de

Grafenhausen (German pronunciation: [ɡʁaːfn̩ˈhaʊzn̩]) is a municipality in the district of Waldshut in Baden-Württemberg in Germany.
