= Schluchsee =

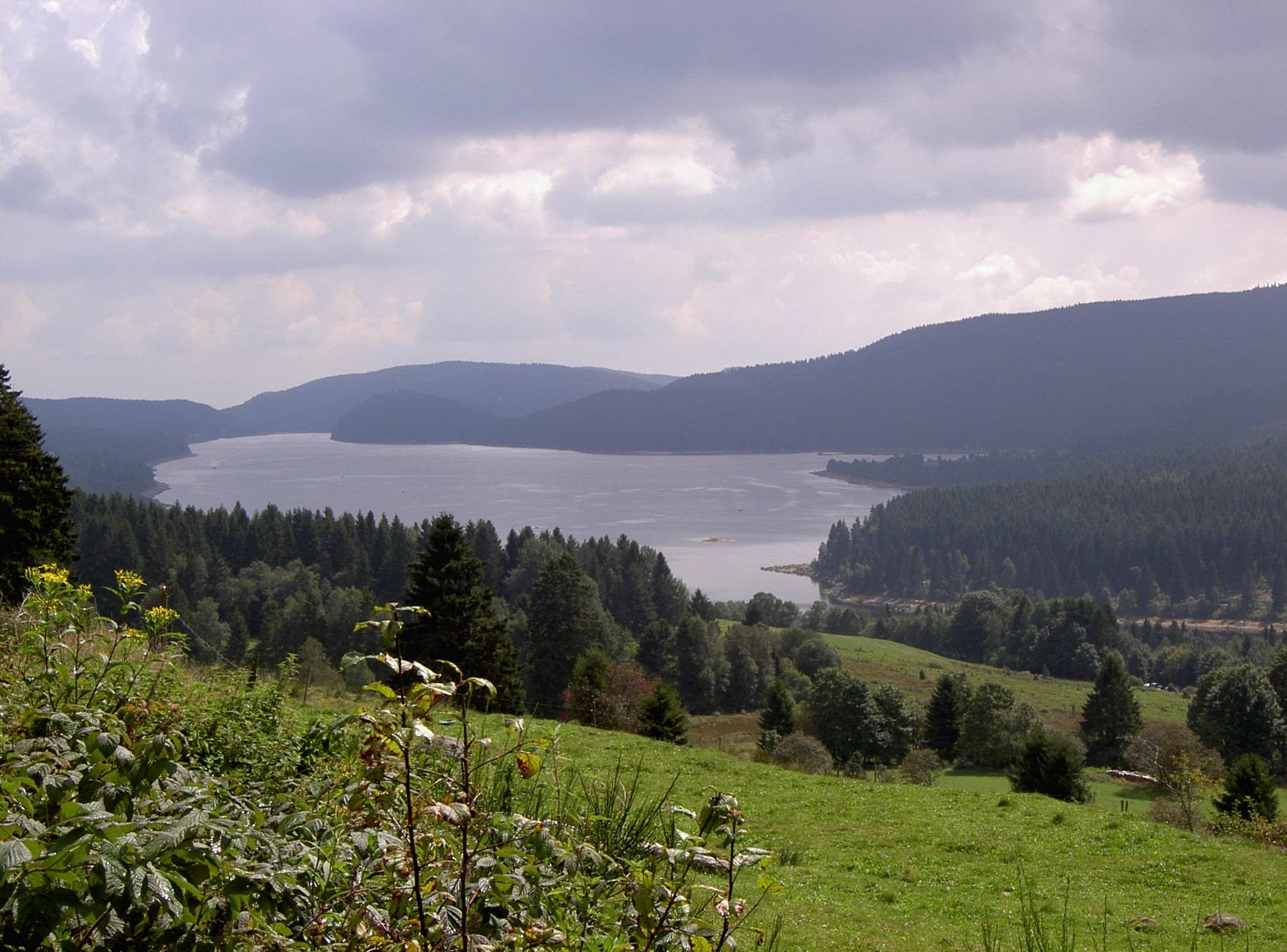

- Location within Germany
- Country: Germany
- Location: Breisgau-Hochschwarzwald
- Coordinates: 47°49′17″N 08°09′10″E
- Construction began: 1929
- Opening date: 1932

Dam and spillways
- Height: 63.5 m (208 ft)
- Length: 250 m (820 ft)
- Width (crest): 3.7 m
- Dam volume: 124,000 m^{3}
- Spillway capacity: 139.8 m^{3}/s

Reservoir
- Total capacity: 114.3 MCM
- Catchment area: 72.78 km^{2}
- Surface area: 5.14 km^{2}

The Schluchsee (German pronunciation: [ˈʃluːxˌzeː]) is a reservoir lake in the district of Breisgau-Hochschwarzwald, southeast of the Titisee in the Black Forest near Freiburg im Breisgau, Germany.

== Name ==
In the Alemannic dialects of the region the name of the lake is the Schluechs [ʃluˑəχs] or Schlues [ʃluˑəs]. Historical sources also spell it with a diphthong: 983 lacus Sluochse, 1095 Schluochsee, 1125 predium Sluocse, 1312 der sê ze Sluoze. Thus it cannot be claimed that the name, as is often asserted, from the Middle High German slûch ="pipe, tube" (Alemannic Schluuch), because in this case in the present dialect and the historical sources no diphthong was available. Albert Krieger links the name to the Middle High German sluocht "ravine". But this meaning is also not accurate.

== Location ==
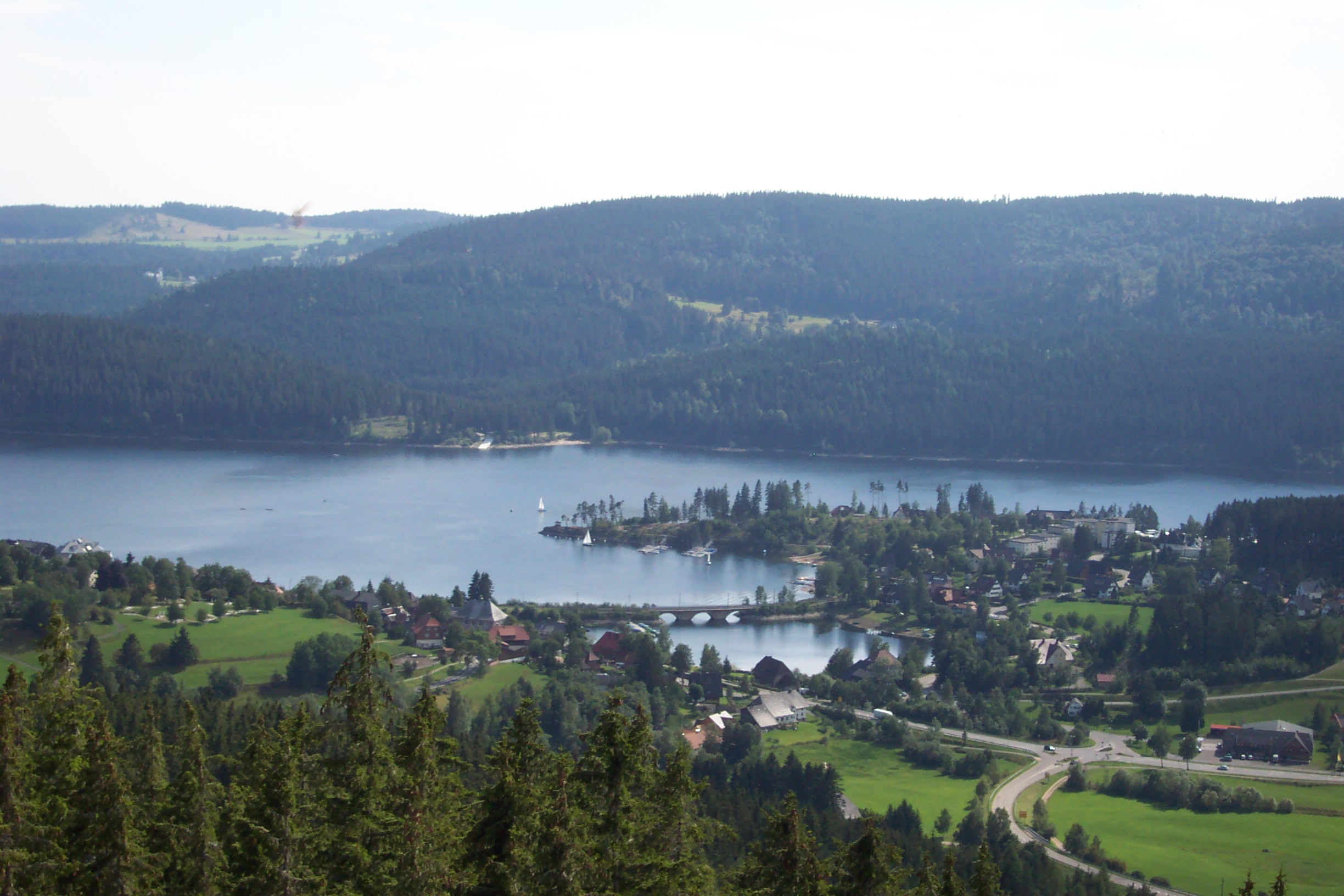

The Schluchsee, with its height of 930 metres (3,050 ft) above sea level, is the highest reservoir in Germany and also the largest lake in the Black Forest. By contrast, the Hornberg Basin (Hornbergbecken) is 1,048 metres above sea level, but is the upper basin of a pumped storage hydropower station, rather than a reservoir.

The water of the reservoir is relatively cool even in summer because of its high elevation.

The best-known settlements around the Schluchsee are on its northern shores and include the eponymous town of Schluchsee and the hamlets of Seebrugg by the dam itself and Aha. The Three Lakes Railway, an extension of the Höllentalbahn, runs from Titisee station along the northern shore to the terminus at Seebrugg.

== History ==
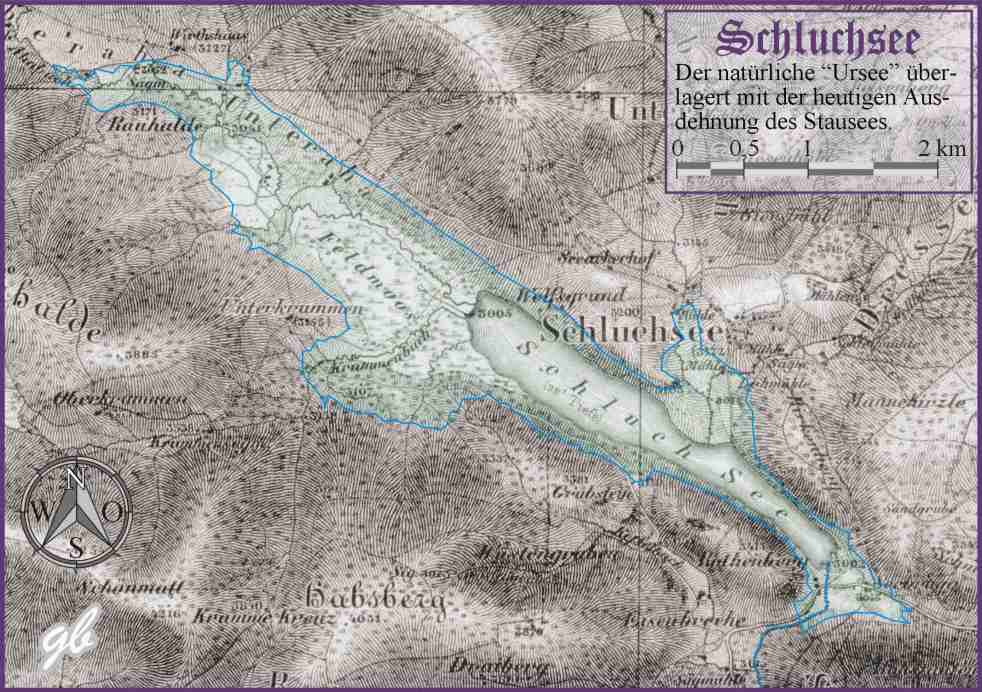
The original lake, now drowned, with its large raised bog, the Feldmoos

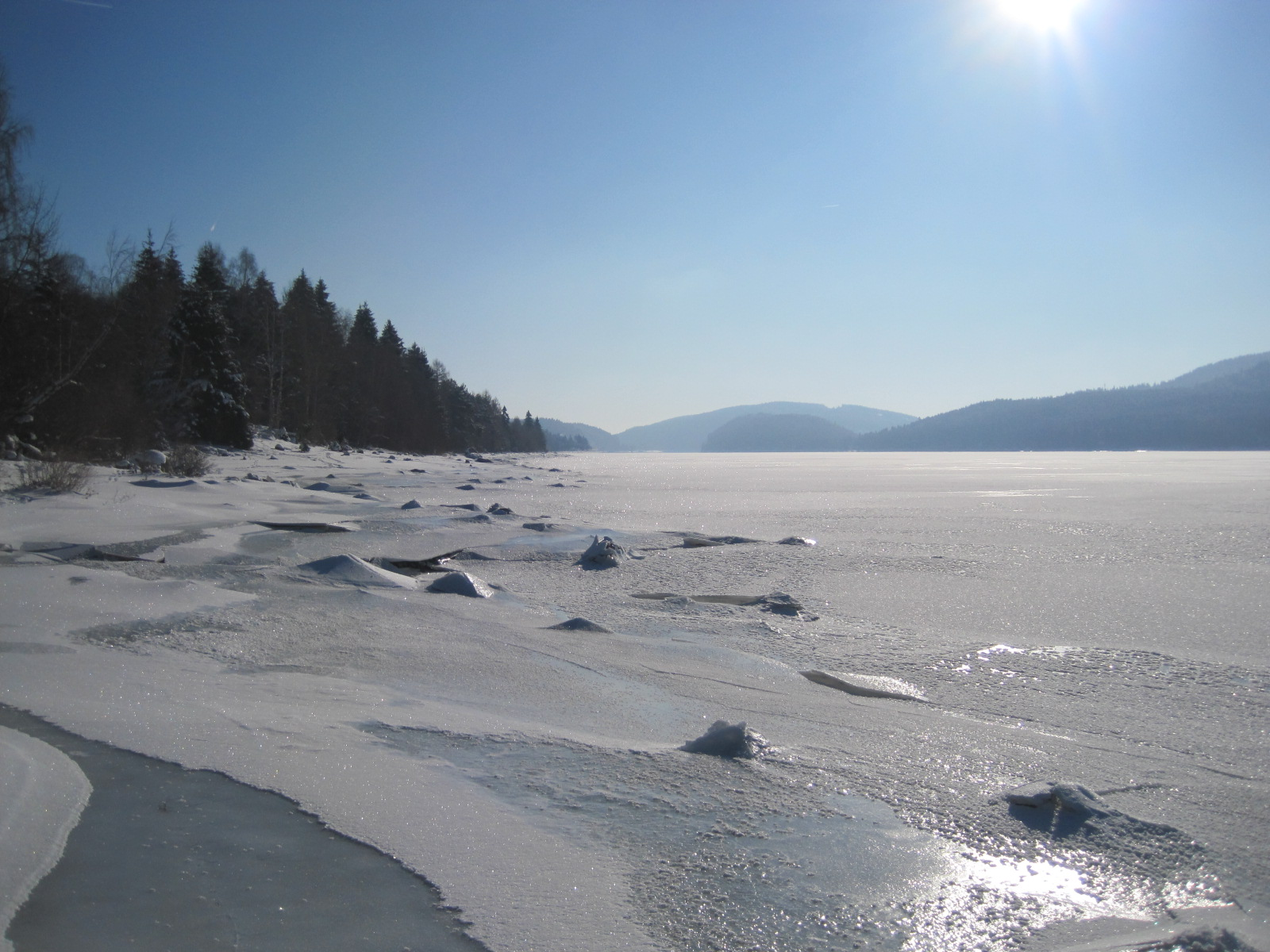

The surface of the original, undammed Schluchsee, a glacier lake, was around 30 metres lower than that of today's reservoir. Despite the dam, the Schluchsee appears natural. The lake is 7.3 km long by 1.4 km across. Its 63.5 m high dam was built between 1929 and 1932, impounding the river Schwarza. In order to construct this gravity dam, the natural lake had first to be deepened by 13 metres. That was achieved in 1930 by blasting out a tunnel in the rock. After that the intake structure of the dam could be built. Today the lake has a maximum depth of 61 m.

The Schluchsee is part of the Schluchsee hydropower station complex run by the Schluchseewerk which has a number of reservoirs of different heights linked by pumping stations. This complex stretches from Häusern to Waldshut. The Schluchsee is therefore the upper basin of the Häusern pump storage hydropower station. The average power generated by the Häusern power station is 100 Megawatts.

In 1982 the Schluchsee became known Germany-wide as the Schlucksee ("Swig Lake") because the German football team 1982 chose the area as their training camp and some players, permitted by the team manager, Jupp Derwall, made full use of it. Excessive alcohol consumption, card games and other escapades showed the subsequent world runners-up in a bad light.

In 1983 almost all the water in the reservoir was drawn down for inspection purposes, rendering the normal swimming, fishing and sailing activities impossible. This rare occurrence still drew many visitors, however, because for the first time the drowned settlements were visible again.

In recent times there have been several conflicts between the Schluchseewerk and the municipality of Schluchsee over the water level of the lake in summer. Whilst the Schluchseewerk is interested in the optimal, economic use of the water and therefore a considerable reduction in the level of the lake, the town is concerned about losing tourists if the lake falls too low for long periods during the summer and exposes a rather unsightly shoreline.

== Tourism ==
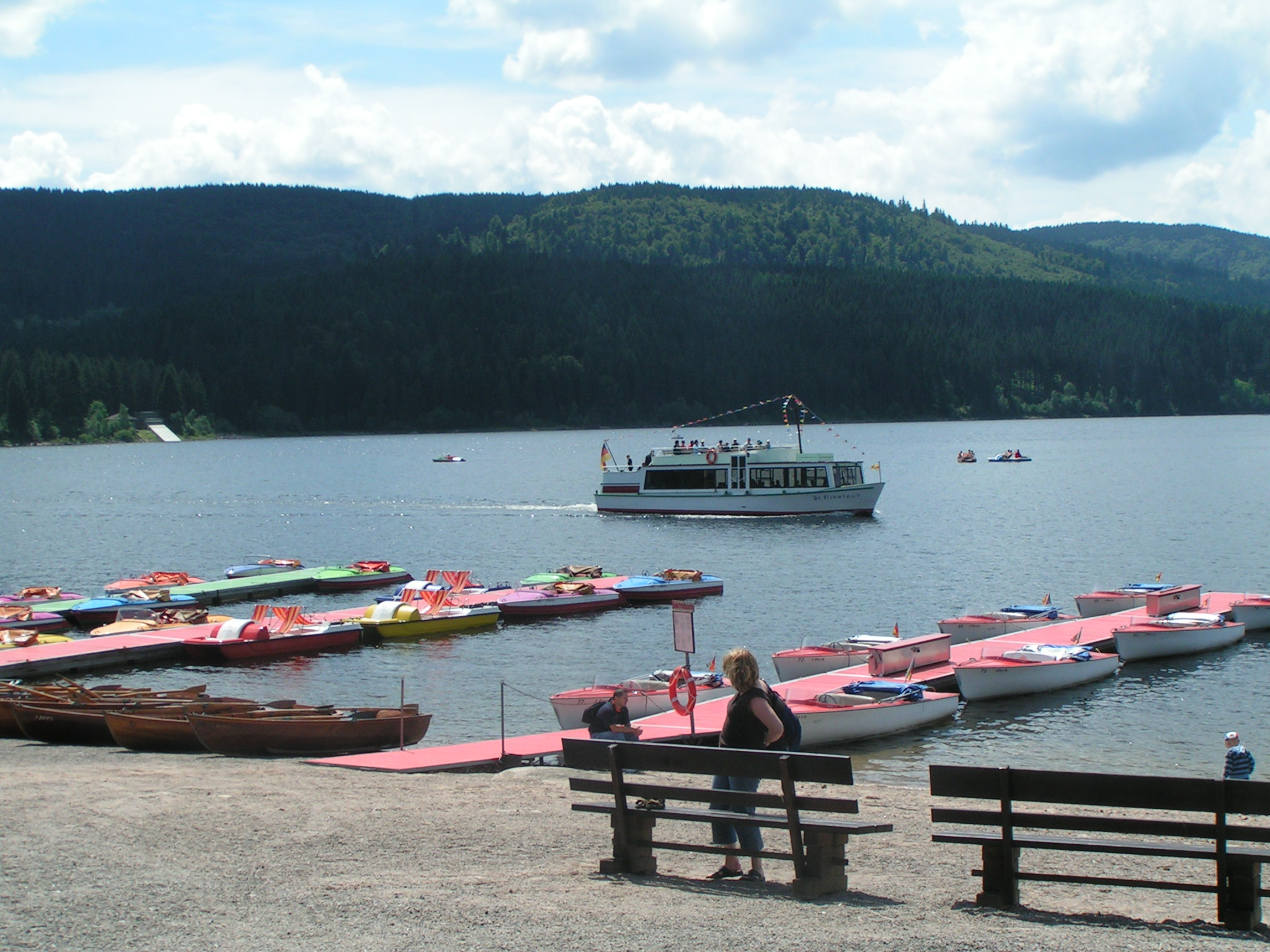
Tourist use of the Schluchsee

Due to its height above sea level, the water of the Schluchsee is relatively cool even in summer. Nevertheless, the lake is popular particularly with swimmers and sailors. Unlike the Titisee, almost all of the Schluchsee's shoreline is easily accessible. As a result, the Schluchsee is very busy in summer and is a popular local resort - even just across the Swiss border. Skinny dipping on the forested side of the lake occasionally causes offence however.

In Seebrugg's station building there is a diving base for diving in the Schluchsee.

The Schluchsee is surrounded by a plethora of hiking trails and the entire lake can be circumnavigated on foot along an 18-kilometre-long path which is largely flat and suitable for prams. From May to October, the walks may be combined with boat trips on the MS Schluchsee.

In 2001, a roughly 30.45-metre-high viewing tower, the Riesenbühl Tower, was built at Riesenbühl (1,097 m, north of the village of Schluchsee) from which there are views over most of the lake.

== Fishing ==
You need a valid German fishing licence in order to be allowed to fish at Schluchsee. Only then you will receive a fishing permit. There are special regulations for holidaymakers. Fishing licences and further information can be obtained from the Citizens' Office in Schluchsee Town Hall.

== Walking ==
The Schluchsee is surrounded by numerous walking trails in the local area. The entire length of the shoreline, about 18 km long, is walkable, mostly level and suitable for prams. From May to October the walks may be combined with boat trips on the pleasure cruiser St. Nikolaus.

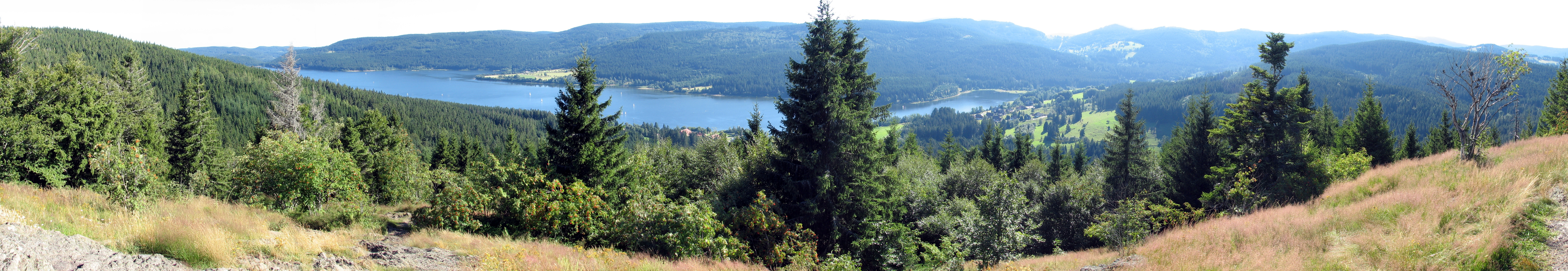
View from Bildstein
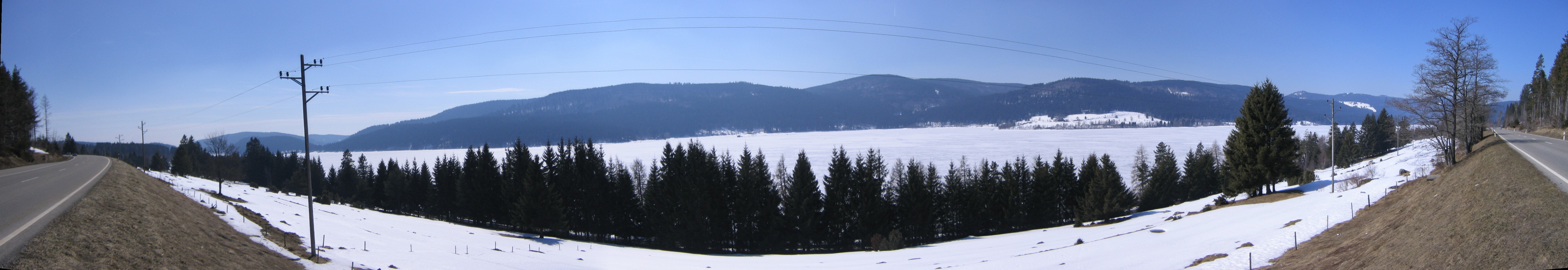
A frozen Schluchsee seen from the B 500 federal road
