= Dachsberg =

- Municipality
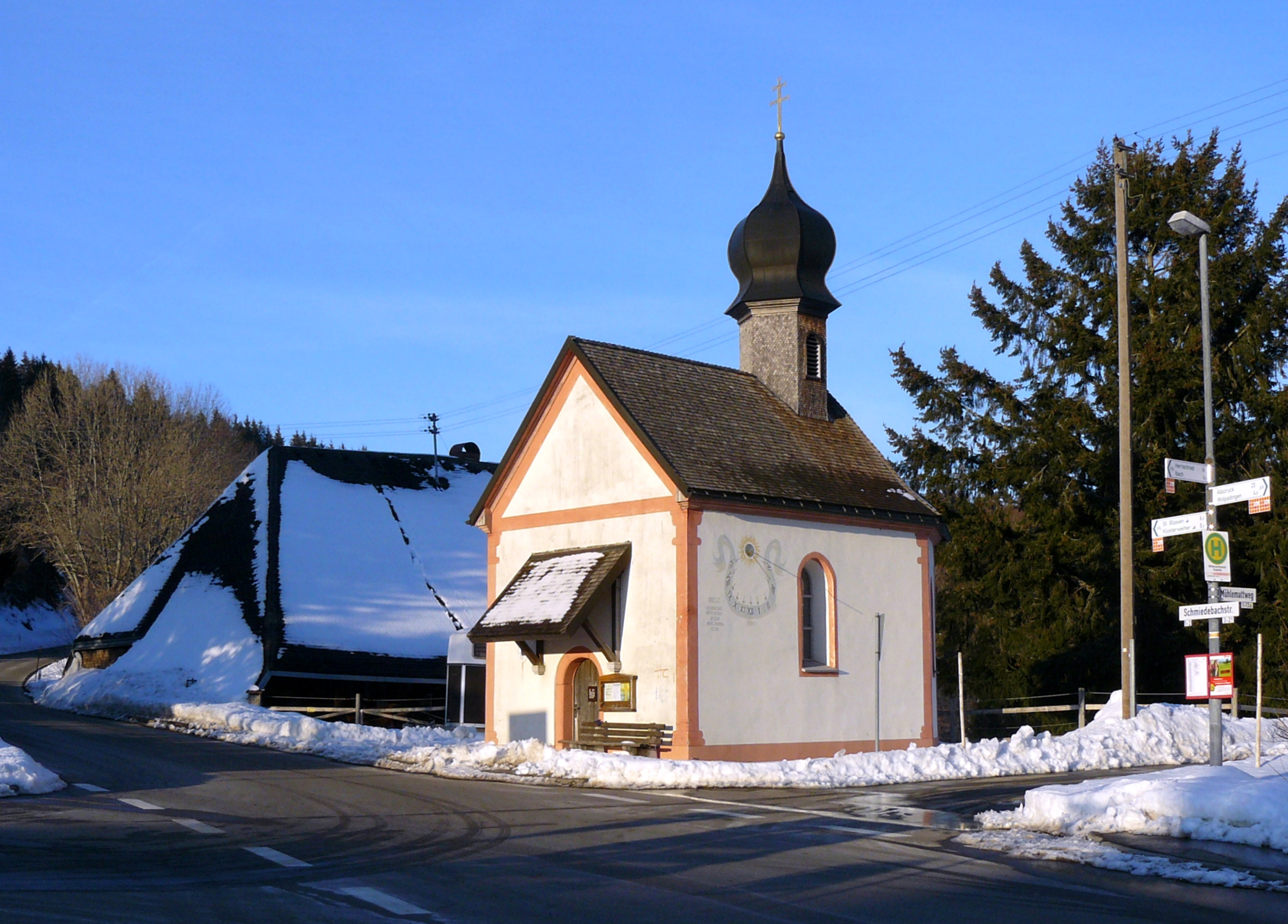

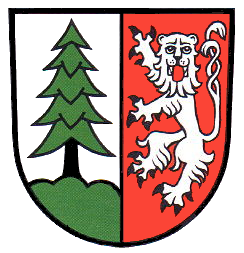
- Coat of arms

- Location of Dachsberg within Waldshut district
- Interactive map of Dachsberg
- Location within Germany Location within Baden-Württemberg
- Coordinates: 47°43′47″N 08°05′56″E
- Country: Germany
- State: Baden-Württemberg
- Admin. region: Freiburg
- District: Waldshut

Government
  - Mayor (2019–27): Stephan Bücheler

Area
  - Total: 35.6 km^{2} (13.7 sq mi)
- Elevation: 842 m (2,762 ft)

Population (2025-12-31)
  - Total: 1,426
  - Density: 40.1/km^{2} (104/sq mi)
- Time zone: UTC+01:00 (CET)
  - Summer (DST): UTC+02:00 (CEST)
- Postal codes: 79875
- Dialling codes: 07672, 07755
- Vehicle registration: WT
- Website: www.dachsberg.de

Dachsberg (German pronunciation: [ˈdaksbɛʁk]) is a municipality in the district of Waldshut in Baden-Württemberg in Germany.
