= Ibach, Germany =

Ibach
- Municipality
- Coat of arms

- Location of Ibach within Waldshut district
- Interactive map of Ibach
- Location within Germany Location within Baden-Württemberg
- Coordinates: 47°44′35″N 08°04′03″E
- Country: Germany
- State: Baden-Württemberg
- Admin. region: Freiburg
- District: Waldshut

Government
  - Mayor (2017–25): Helmut Kaiser

Area
  - Total: 21.38 km^{2} (8.25 sq mi)
- Elevation: 964 m (3,163 ft)

Population (2025-12-31)
  - Total: 341
  - Density: 15.9/km^{2} (41.3/sq mi)
- Time zone: UTC+01:00 (CET)
  - Summer (DST): UTC+02:00 (CEST)
- Postal codes: 79837
- Dialling codes: 07672
- Vehicle registration: WT
- Website: www.ibach-schwarzwald.de

Ibach (German pronunciation: [ˈiːbax]) is a municipality in the district of Waldshut in Baden-Württemberg in Germany.
