= Häusern =

- Municipality
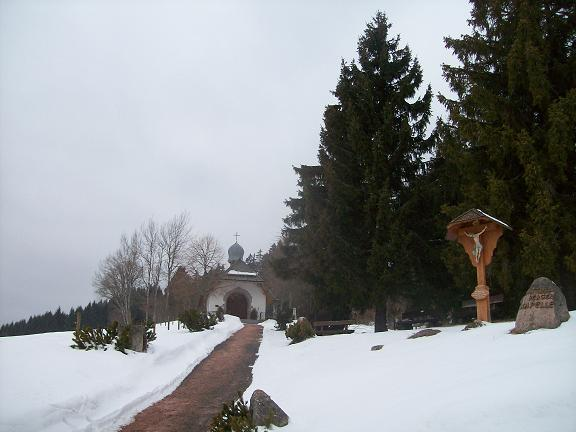

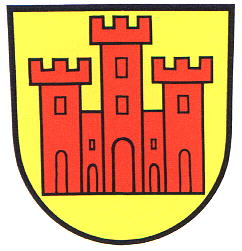
- Coat of arms

- Location of Häusern within Waldshut district
- Interactive map of Häusern
- Location within Germany Location within Baden-Württemberg
- Coordinates: 47°45′14″N 08°10′10″E
- Country: Germany
- State: Baden-Württemberg
- Admin. region: Freiburg
- District: Waldshut

Government
  - Mayor (2017–25): Thomas Kaiser

Area
  - Total: 8.88 km^{2} (3.43 sq mi)
- Elevation: 889 m (2,917 ft)

Population (2025-12-31)
  - Total: 1,297
  - Density: 146/km^{2} (378/sq mi)
- Time zone: UTC+01:00 (CET)
  - Summer (DST): UTC+02:00 (CEST)
- Postal codes: 79837
- Dialling codes: 07672
- Vehicle registration: WT

Häusern (German pronunciation: [ˈhɔʏzɐn]) is a municipality in the district of Waldshut in Baden-Württemberg in Germany.
