= Todtmoos =

Village in southwestern Germany

- Municipality
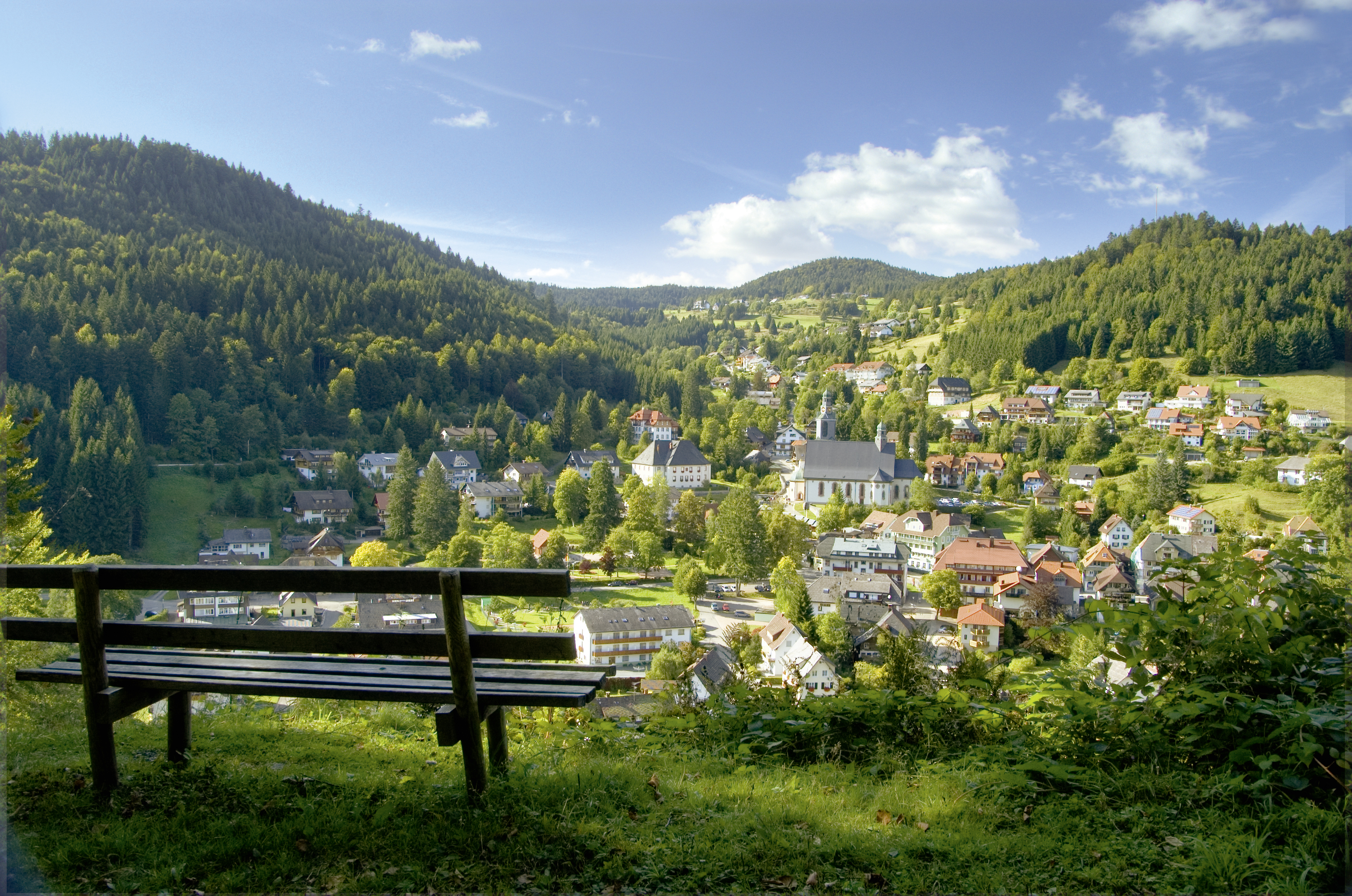

- Coat of arms

- Location of Todtmoos within Waldshut district
- Interactive map of Todtmoos
- Location within Germany Location within Baden-Württemberg
- Coordinates: 47°44′N 8°0′E
- Country: Germany
- State: Baden-Württemberg
- Admin. region: Freiburg
- District: Waldshut

Government
  - Mayor (2022–30): Marcel Schneider

Area
  - Total: 28.09 km^{2} (10.85 sq mi)
- Elevation: 820 m (2,690 ft)

Population (2025-12-31)
  - Total: 1,837
  - Density: 65.40/km^{2} (169.4/sq mi)
- Time zone: UTC+01:00 (CET)
  - Summer (DST): UTC+02:00 (CEST)
- Postal codes: 79682
- Dialling codes: 07674
- Vehicle registration: WT
- Website: www.todtmoos.de

Todtmoos (German pronunciation: [ˈtɔtmoːs]) is a village and municipality in the district of Waldshut in the southern part of Baden-Württemberg, Germany.
