= Waldshut (district) =

Coordinates: 47.63°N 8.2°E

- District
- Flag Coat of arms
- Country: Germany
- State: Baden-Württemberg
- Adm. region: Freiburg
- Capital: Waldshut-Tiengen

Government
  - District admin.: Martin Kistler

Area
  - Total: 1,131.18 km^{2} (436.75 sq mi)

Population (31 December 2023)
  - Total: 171,777
  - Density: 151.856/km^{2} (393.306/sq mi)
- Time zone: UTC+01:00 (CET)
  - Summer (DST): UTC+02:00 (CEST)
- Vehicle registration: WT, SÄK
- Website: www.landkreis-waldshut.de

Waldshut (German pronunciation: [ˌvalt͡sˈhuːt]) is a Landkreis (district) in the south of Baden-Württemberg, Germany. Neighbouring districts are (clockwise from the west) Lörrach, Breisgau-Hochschwarzwald and Schwarzwald-Baar; followed in the south by the Swiss cantons of Schaffhausen, Zürich and Aargau.

== History ==
The district dates to the Oberamt Waldshut, which was created when the area became part of the state of Baden in the beginning of the 19th century. After some changes it was converted to a district in 1938. In 1973 the districts Säckingen and Hochschwarzwald were dissolved and were partially added to the district Waldshut, which then grew to its current size.

== Geography ==
The district covers the southern part of the Black Forest. The river Rhine forms most of the boundary to Switzerland.

== Coat of arms ==
District banner of Waldshut

The present coat of arms was granted on December 11, 1973, superseding an older one. The bend wavy represents the river Rhine as the main river of the district. The wheel on a blue ground symbolizes the district's hydro-electric power industry (there was also a wheel in the old coat of arms). The abbot's staff was taken from the arms of the district of Säckingen, to symbolize its monasteries. Green is used to signify the Black Forest.

== Towns and municipalities ==
Clickable map of towns and municipalities in the district

Towns	Municipalities
1. Bad Säckingen; 2. Bonndorf (Schwarzwald); 3. Laufenburg (Baden); 4. St. Blasien; 5. Stühlingen; 6. Waldshut-Tiengen; 7. Wehr (Baden)	1. Albbruck; 2. Bernau im Schwarzwald; 3. Dachsberg (Südschwarzwald); 4. Dettighofen; 5. Dogern; 6. Eggingen; 7. Görwihl; 8. Grafenhausen; 9. Häusern; 10. Herrischried; 11. Höchenschwand; 12. Hohentengen am Hochrhein; 13. Ibach; 14. Jestetten; 15. Klettgau; 16. Küssaberg; 17. Lauchringen; 18. Lottstetten; 19. Murg; 20. Rickenbach; 21. Todtmoos; 22. Ühlingen-Birkendorf; 23. Weilheim; 24. Wutach; 25. Wutöschingen
Verwaltungsgemeinschaften	1. Albbruck; 2. Bernau im Schwarzwald; 3. Dachsberg (Südschwarzwald); 4. Dettighofen; 5. Dogern; 6. Eggingen; 7. Görwihl; 8. Grafenhausen; 9. Häusern; 10. Herrischried; 11. Höchenschwand; 12. Hohentengen am Hochrhein; 13. Ibach; 14. Jestetten; 15. Klettgau; 16. Küssaberg; 17. Lauchringen; 18. Lottstetten; 19. Murg; 20. Rickenbach; 21. Todtmoos; 22. Ühlingen-Birkendorf; 23. Weilheim; 24. Wutach; 25. Wutöschingen
1. Bonndorf; 2. Jestetten; 3. Küssaberg; 4. Oberes Schlüchttal; 5. Bad Säckingen; 6. St. Blasien; 7. Waldshut-Tiengen; 8. Wutöschingen	1. Albbruck; 2. Bernau im Schwarzwald; 3. Dachsberg (Südschwarzwald); 4. Dettighofen; 5. Dogern; 6. Eggingen; 7. Görwihl; 8. Grafenhausen; 9. Häusern; 10. Herrischried; 11. Höchenschwand; 12. Hohentengen am Hochrhein; 13. Ibach; 14. Jestetten; 15. Klettgau; 16. Küssaberg; 17. Lauchringen; 18. Lottstetten; 19. Murg; 20. Rickenbach; 21. Todtmoos; 22. Ühlingen-Birkendorf; 23. Weilheim; 24. Wutach; 25. Wutöschingen
