= Wutach =

Wutach may refer to:

- Wutach (river), a river in Baden-Württemberg
- Wutach (municipality), a municipality through which the river flows
- Wutach Gorge, a gorge system through which the river flows
