= Schwarza (Black Forest) =

River in Germany

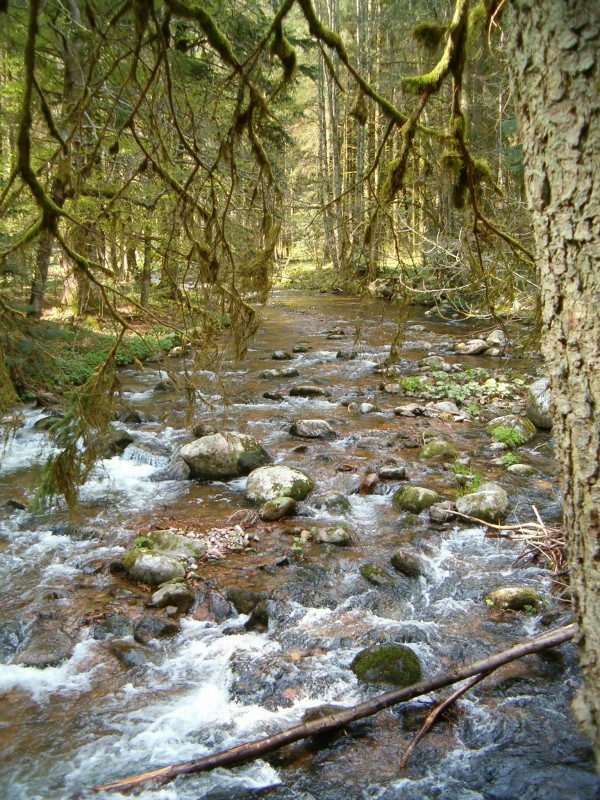
- The Schwarza between the Witznau reservoir and "Leinegg" (latter at the confluence with Fohrenbach creek)

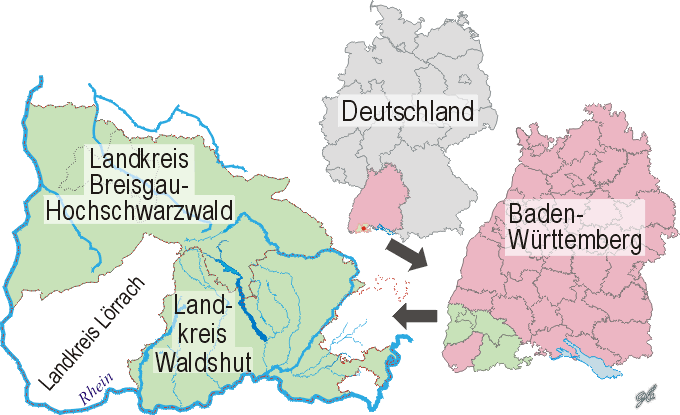
- Map of the location of the Schwarza in Germany, Baden-Württemberg, and in and near the Districts (Singular in German: Landkreis) of Breisgau-Hochschwarzwald, Waldshut und Lörrach

Location
- Country: Germany
- State: Baden-Württemberg
- Districts: Waldshut; Breisgau-Hochschwarzwald

Physical characteristics
- Source: Schluchsee
  - location: Schluchsee Municipality, Breisgau-Hochschwarzwald District
  - coordinates: 47°48′01″N 8°11′00″E
  - elevation: 890 m (2,920 ft)
- Mouth: Schlücht
  - location: Witznau, Ühlingen-Birkendorf, Waldshut District
  - coordinates: 47°40′44″N 8°15′20″E
  - elevation: 427 m (1,401 ft)
- Length: 18.4 km (11.4 mi)
- Basin size: 112 km^{2} (43 sq mi)

Basin features
- River system: Rhine drainage basin
- Progression: Schlücht→ Wutach→ Rhine→ North Sea

The Schwarza (German pronunciation: [ˈʃvaʁtsa]) is a river in the districts of Waldshut and Breisgau-Hochschwarzwald in Baden-Württemberg, Germany. It is in the Rhine drainage basin and is a right tributary of the Schlücht.

== See also ==
- List of rivers of Baden-Württemberg
