= Steina (Wutach) =

River in Germany

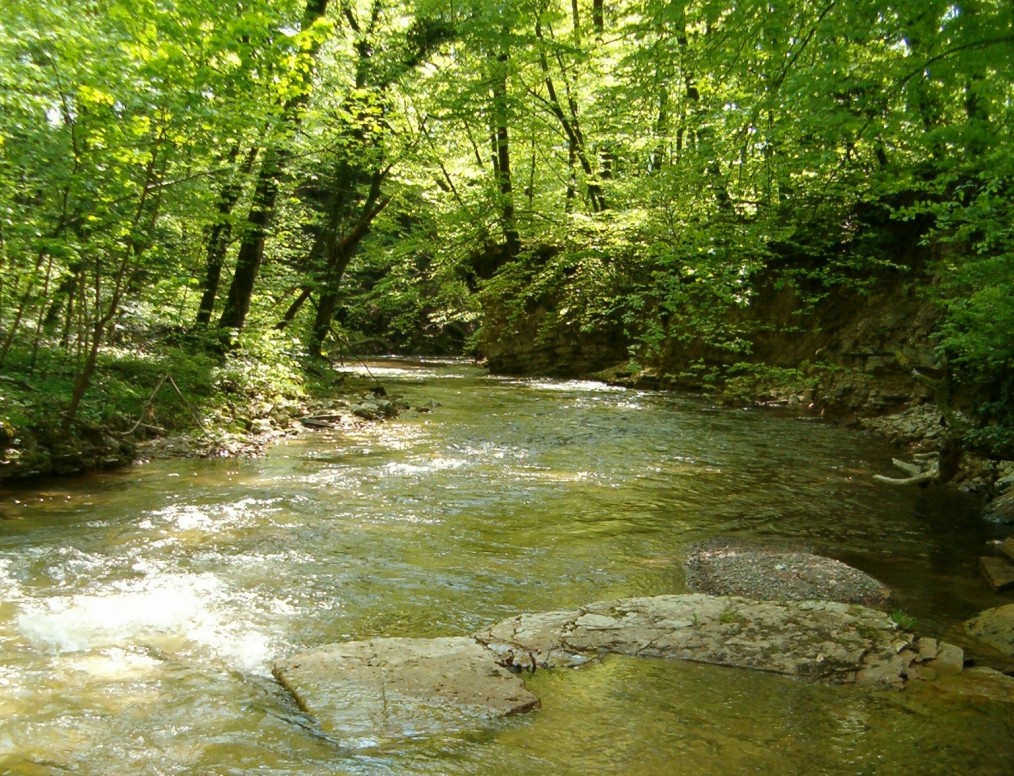

Location
- Country: Germany
- State: Baden-Württemberg

Physical characteristics
- Mouth
  - location: Wutach
  - coordinates: 47.6337°N 8.2894°E
- Length: 37.4 km (23.2 mi)

Basin features
- Progression: Wutach→ Rhine→ North Sea

Steina (German pronunciation: [ˈʃtaɪna]) is a river of Baden-Württemberg, Germany. It flows into the Wutach near Lauchringen.

== See also ==
- List of rivers of Baden-Württemberg
