= Klingengraben =

River in Germany

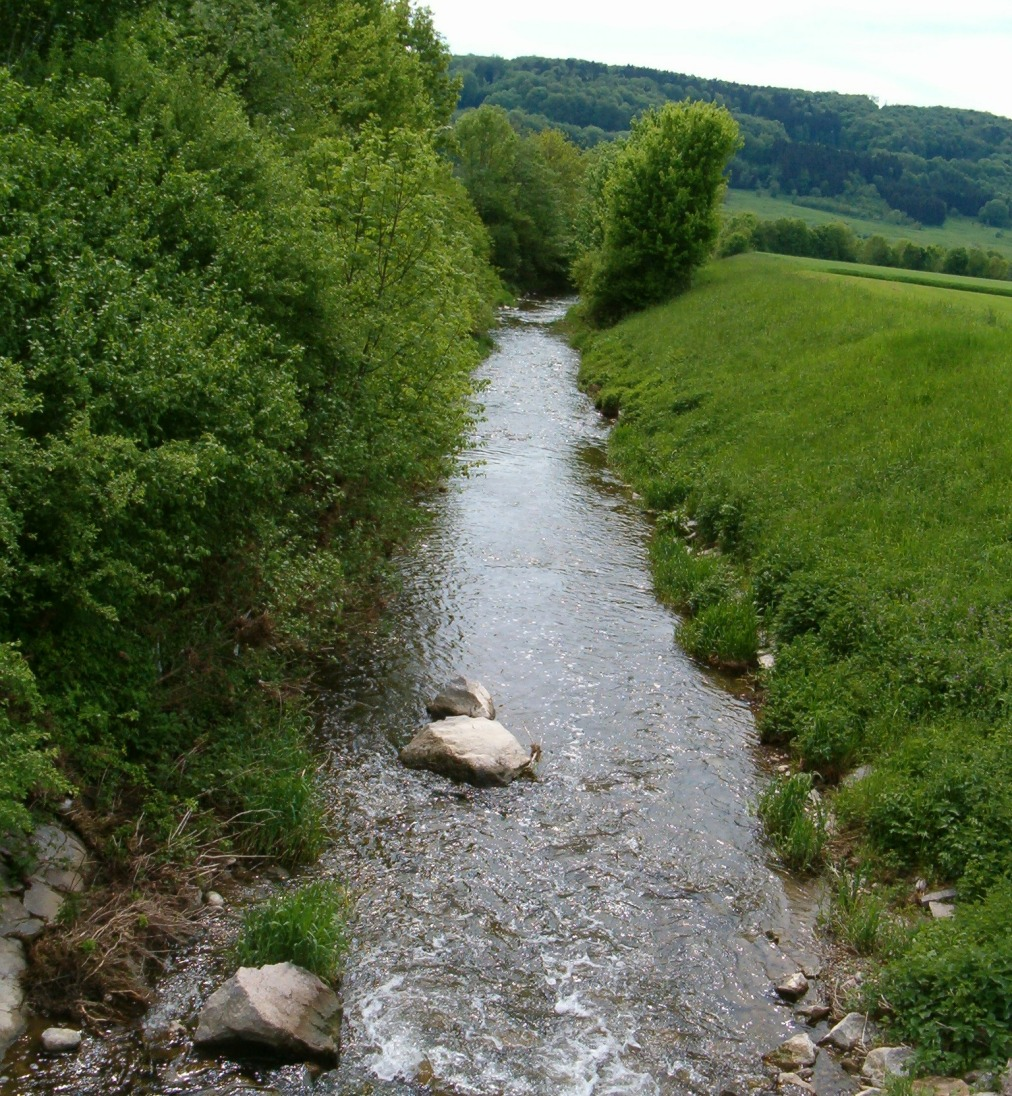

Location
- Countries: Germany and Switzerland
- State: Baden-Württemberg
- Canton: Schaffhausen

Physical characteristics
- Mouth
  - location: Wutach
  - coordinates: 47.6229°N 8.3244°E
- Length: 23.4 km (14.5 mi)

Basin features
- Progression: Wutach→ Rhine→ North Sea

Klingengraben is a river of the Canton of Schaffhausen, northern Switzerland and Baden-Württemberg, south-western Germany. It passes through Klettgau and flows into the Wutach in Lauchringen.

== See also ==
- List of rivers of Baden-Württemberg
