= Wutach Gorge =

Nature reserve in Baden-Württemberg, Germany

Wutach Gorge Nature Reserve (Naturschutzgebiet Wutachschlucht)
- IUCN category IV (habitat/species management area)
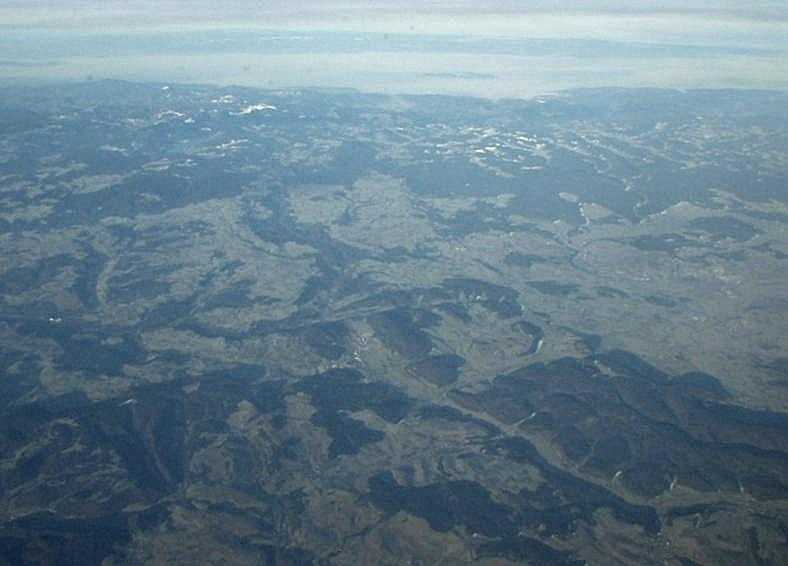
- From the direction of the Feldberg to the Blumberg Gate (Blumberger Pforte, centre) the Wutach crosses the open South Baar countryside in a long forested gorge. From here it flows to the left through the Wutachflühen to the Rhine, whereas its former valley, 165 metres higher, continues to the right and runs down to the Danube.
- Interactive map of Wutach Gorge Nature Reserve (Naturschutzgebiet Wutachschlucht)
- Location: Germany, Baden-Württemberg, counties of Breisgau-Hochschwarzwald, Schwarzwald-Baar-Kreis and Waldshut
- Coordinates: 47°50′41″N 8°18′43″E
- Area: 968.8 ha (2,394 acres)
- Created: 26 July 1939
- Designated: 1025 ?
- Administrator: Regierungspräsidium Freiburg
- Website: WPDA

The Wutach Gorge (German: Wutachschlucht) is a narrow, steep-sided valley in southern Germany through in the upper reaches of the River Wutach with three gorge-like sections, the lowest of which is also called the Wutachflühen. The gorge cuts through the southern part of the Baar region from the eastern side of the High Black Forest heading eastwards to the Trauf the steep, northwestern flank of the Swabian Jura, which transitions to the Randen mountains here.

The 60- to 170-metre-deep gorges stretch for over 33 river kilometres (excluding side gorges) and are notable for many reasons. Their geologically young, prototypical and actively continuing development results in a great variety of geotopes and biotopes that support a correspondingly rich range of flora and fauna. The gorges are very popular with tourists and played an important role in the establishment of conservation consciousness in southwestern Germany. The Wutach Gorge is part of the Southern Black Forest Nature Park.

== Course and character ==
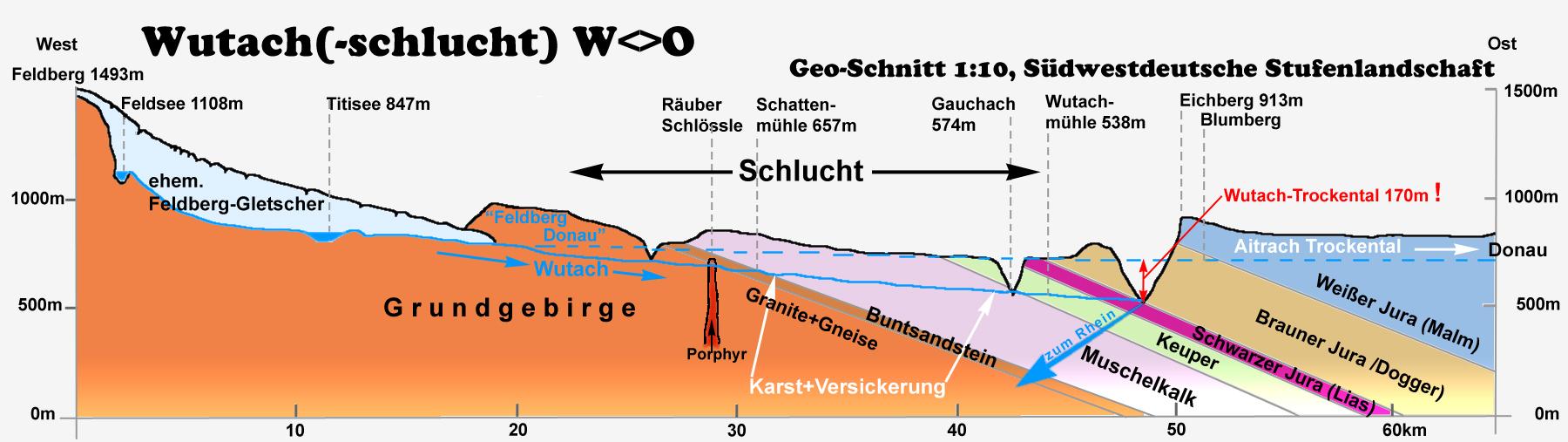
Section of the South German Scarplands along the Wutach

The ravines start in the valley of the Gutach (the upper reaches of the Wutach) below Neustadt and in the valley of the Haslach below Lenzkirch. After they merge to form the Wutach they run, with small changes of direction, initially generally eastward and end at the village of Grimmelshofen in the municipality of Stühlingen after the Wutach turns sharply southwards in the area of the former mining town of Blumberg on meeting the steep slopes of the Baaralb. Initially, the gorge is bordered by the wooded plateaus of the eastern slopes of the Black Forest. Later, its northern border is formed by the historical Bertholdsbaar with the population centre of Löffingen and the village of Rötenbach. To the south is a similar muschelkalk plateau with the settlements of Bonndorf and Wutach.

Over a straight-line distance of barely 20 kilometres, the Wutach and several of its tributaries have cut a natural profile section through almost all of the strata of South German Scarplands, which fan out a further 200 kilometres to the north, but surface here in close succession. The Mesozoic rock layers were clearly inclined more steeply than usual here (on average 7%) by the uplifting of the southern Black Forest and have been cut through here in succession by the Wutach. Because the Wutach "only" descends through a gradient of around 1% as it flows eastward, increasingly younger rocks are encountered, each overlaid over its predecessor, as one progresses down the gorge. This has created a continuous sequence of rock outcrops from the basement (here mostly granite) through the Triassic to the Jurassic. As these rocks each produce their own peculiar and very different landforms when they are cut by vertical erosion, one of the most diversified and most interesting gorge landscapes in Central Europe has resulted. The gorges often transition seamlessly into wide valleys where it is hard to imagine that steep ravines are so nearby.

Not only do the gorges themselves form their own natural regions, but the plateaux across which they cut have also been given the status of independent natural regional units. So the Central Wutach Region (Mittlere Wutachgebiet) lies between the natural regions of the Baar to the north and the Klettgau Hills (Klettgauer Hügelland) to the south, both of which are similar in terms of their bedrock. The region is also a bridge between the mountains of the Black Forest and the Swabian Jura.

== Gorge system of the Wutach and its tributaries ==
=== Upper gorge in the basement rock ===
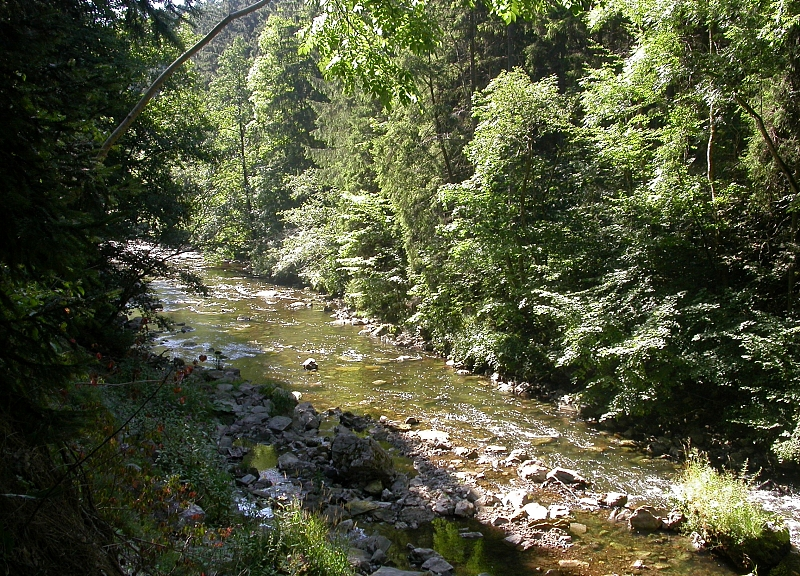
Trackless section of the Upper Gorge in the basement rock

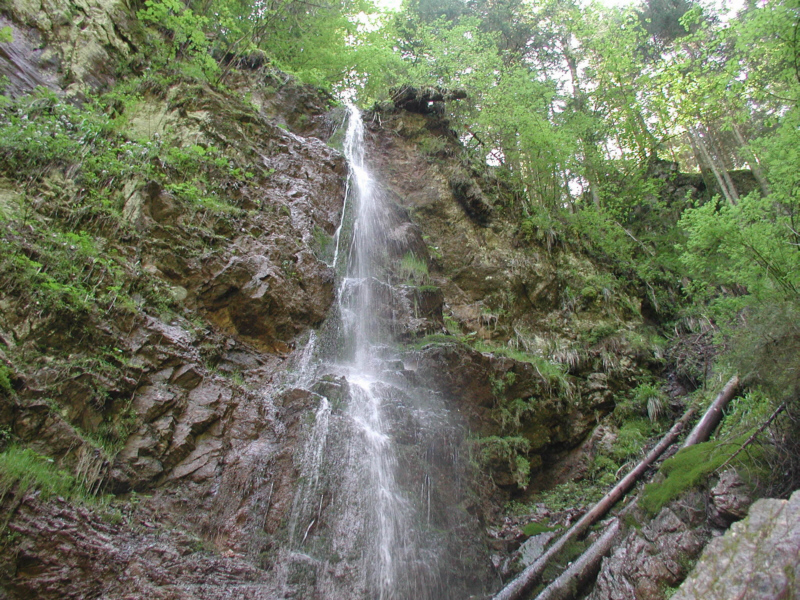
Waterfall in the lower Lotenbach Gorge

At the exit of the wide bottomed valleys of the Gutach and the Haslach from the eastern Black Forest, which were heavily shaped by the ice age, the streams often cut through narrow gorges as the gradient increases suddenly. In the granite that initially dominates, dark, trackless ravines alternate with short sections where the valley broadens out. The rocky sides of the valley also have naturally high proportion of conifers. Downstream, in the area of the less resistant beds of bunter sandstone, spectacular gorge scenery is absent. The side gorges of this upper section of the main gorge are narrow; several would be impassible without man-made paths being laid through them.

The gorge of the main headstream, the Gutach, begins with a noticeably increased gradient just above the Gutach Bridge (built 1900) on the Höllental Railway, whose stone arches support a span of 64 metres, then the longest in Germany. The deepest point of the Haslach Gorge, which joins from the right, is the Rechenfelsen, a short ravine that is a good 20 metres deep. The Rötenbach Gorge, which merges from the left soon thereafter, culminates in a waterfall with two cascades and a total height of 6 metres. Below the few remains of Stallegg Castle the Wutach is quietened by a small reservoir belonging to the Stallegg Electricity Works and built in 1895. Shortly afterwards the stream passes the covered, wooden Stallegg Bridge, on the old path between the Fürstenberg estates on either side of the gorge. At point where it is joined by the Reichenbach Gorge the river forces itself through the granite schrofen of the trackless Stallegg Gorge (Stallegger Schlucht). It ends at the Räuberschlössle rocks with their ruined castle, the New Blumberg (also New Blumegg). The rocks lie north of the Wutach and are quartz porphyry formation up to 80 metres high that are also called the Nägelefels due to the presence of Cheddar Pinks. Near the mill of Schattenmühle and the road crossing the Lotenbach Gorge (Lotenbachklamm) joins from the right, a granite gorge with four waterfalls up to 8 metres high, as well as a tributary stream that plunges 20 metres into the river.

=== Valley from Dietfurt and Bad Boll ===
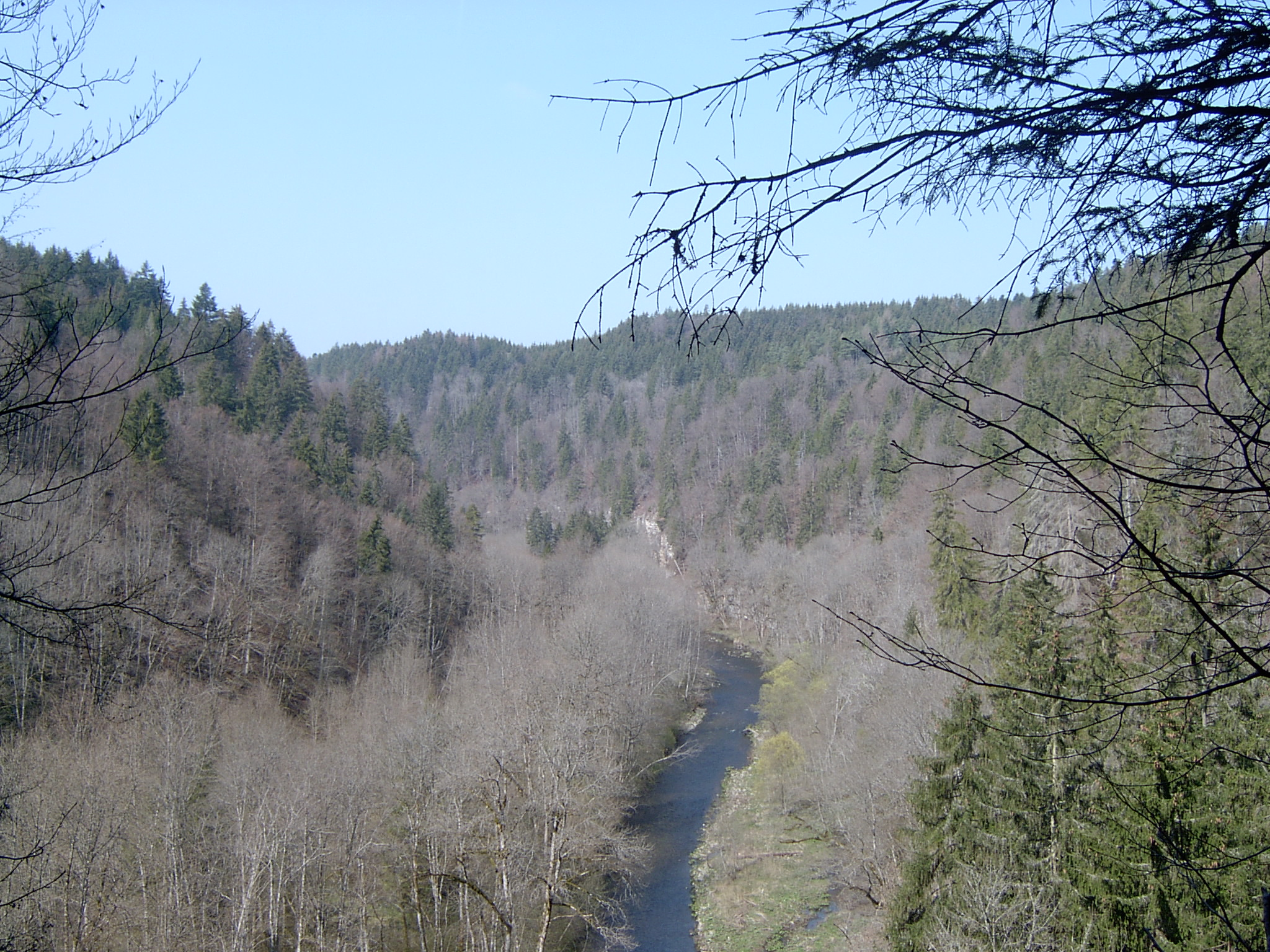
The Wutach Gorge near Reiselfingen. Here: a wide V-shaped valley

As the river enters the Lower and Middle Muschelkalk rock, the typical Black Forest landscape ends. The limestones, which have been heavily deformed and made slippery by the leaching of gypsum deposits, have given rise to a slightly wider V-shaped valley with a great diversity of habitats and constantly changing local relief. For example, extensive tufa formations rise above the footpath on the sunny slopes of the Schelmenhalde with its wide, plunging waterfall, whilst, opposite, a Muschelkalk formation called the Drei Zinnen ("Three Battlements"), which was once perforated by cavities and has now collapsed, slips downstream on slippery masses of Middle Muschelkalk towards the Wutach. Deciduous forest communities now dominate, although occasional meadows interrupt the riparian woodland.

Further down the valley, initially on the upper slopes, elongated rock faces made of Upper Muschelkalk strata are typical, especially the roughly one-kilometre-long Rappenfelsen on the left above the subsiding subsoil. This is where the Gaisloch, which has collapsed to create an open gorge, joins the main valley. Below it, the oldest and very steep gorge crossing led over the river by the former mill at the Dietfurt; there was a bridge in here in 1614-1632. The centre of the valley was the historic Badhof near the Fritz Hockenjos Footbridge; an avenue and the remains of the park have survived.. On a rocky spur above it, New Tannegg Castle (built by about 1200) had to be abandoned before 1500, because it had partially collapsed down the precipitous cliff. Immediately below the Boller Waterfall cascades for 40 metres in two stages into the Wutach from the right. This is the highest waterfall in the Wutach Gorge and was, when Bad Boll was still a spa resort, lit up at night. Today it is almost impossible to get to. At the Felsenweiher, an old backwater below a rock face of the Upper Muschelkalk, the Tannegg Waterfall (named after the ruins of Old Tannegg Castle) tumbles 15 metres over a bizarre tufa formation. Roughly opposite is the Münzloch, the longest cave of the Wutach Gorge, 84 metres in length.

=== Middle gorge in main Muschelkalk ===
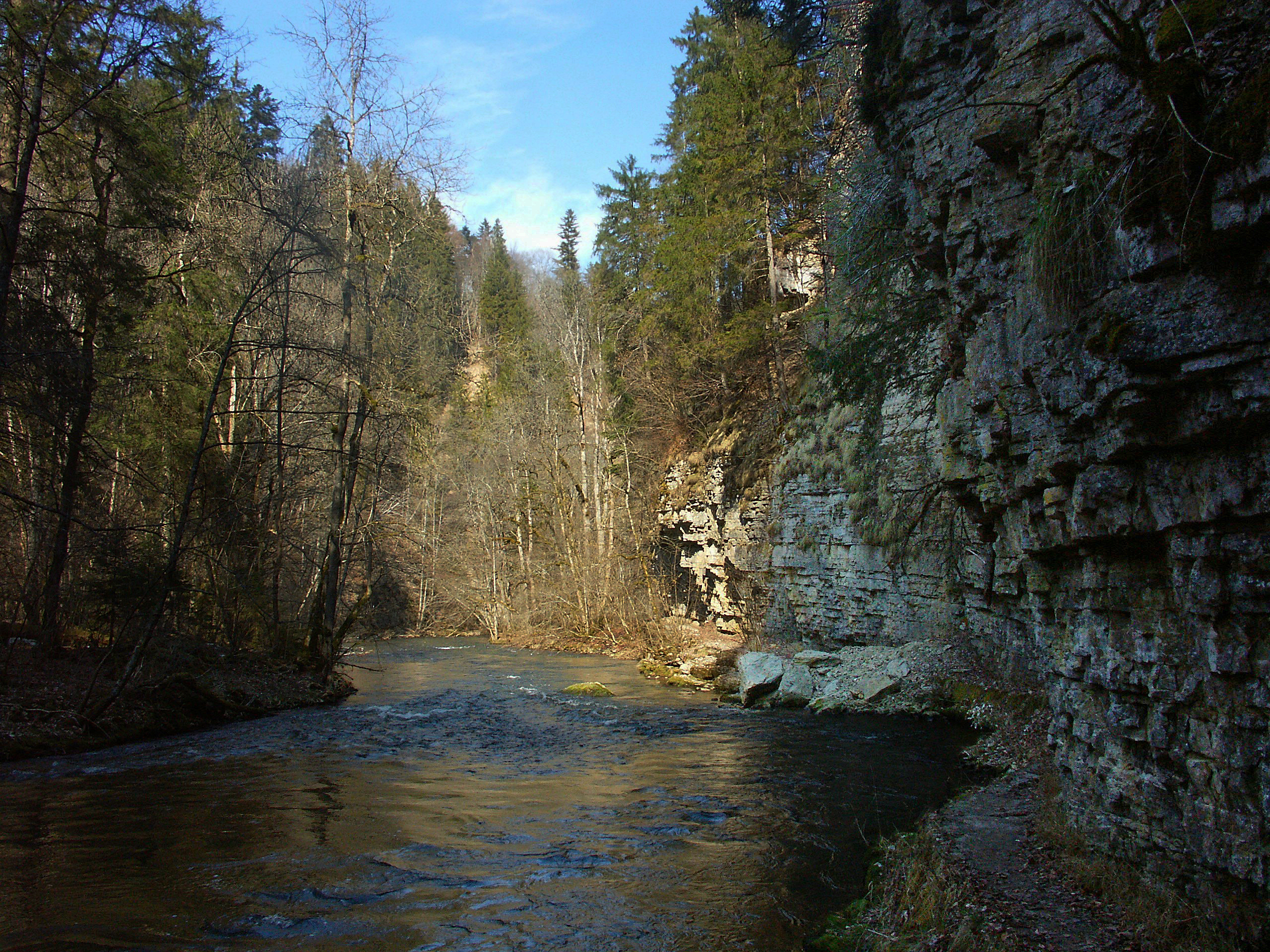
Muschelkalk rock face (the Amselfelsen) in the central gorge

Further downstream, as soon as the Muschelkalk rock faces reach the valley bottom, the canyon-like second gorge section begins. It was the earliest part of the gorge to be developed and remains the most interesting part of the gorge for tourists today. Here the Wutach swings from one rock face to another on its broad gravel bed, sometimes undercutting the rock, which is left overhanging and is up to about 80 metres high.

The Ludwig Neumann Way (Ludwig-Neumann-Weg) is one of the most elaborate trail systems maintained by the Black Forest Club and, after almost all the bridges in the original network were destroyed by floods, is exposed but protected by the rock faces. At the very beginning it crosses the Amselfels rock, nearly 70 metres high, with views of the Großer Kanzelfels ("Great Pulpit Rock") to the north. Parts of its right-hand pulpit collapsed in 1983 about 80 metres into the Wutach. The following long, partly overhanging, rock refuge, Engländerfels was named in memory of an Englishman who fell to his death here in 1906. The Forellenfelsen also recalls the early English fashion of travelling to the Black Forest for "fishing holidays" in the Wutach Gorge. The central rest stop in the middle gorge is in a spot where the valley widens and is called the Schurhammer Hut. In the following section, the Wutach sinks largely into crevices in the muschelkalk rocks and re-emerges after 1.3 kilometres at the foot of an overhanging section of the rock face. In 1953, the cavern-like Old Wutach portal by the old Rümmelesteg footbridge collapsed; leaving half the suspension bridge anchored to the rock. The Josefsfelsen rocks with their crowning rock pinnacle and the Josefssteg footbridge commemorate another victim of a fall in 1907. The end of the middle gorge is marked by the covered Canadian Bridge (Kanadiersteg), which was built in 1976 by Canadian engineers. It runs from mouth of the Gauchach to the high mountain spur on the southern side with its old spur castle, the Hörnle.

=== Achdorf valley in the Keuper and Lower Jurassic ===
After the Gauchach Gorge joins the main artery from the north, the valley widens again and is open, accessible and populated. At the first road bridge is the Wutachmühle with its sawmill and kiosk. The almost undeveloped valley sides with their rugged, sometimes bizarre relief, leave one to conjecture at the almost continual slip and creep processes of the few remaining solid formations of Keuper rock. Four of the nine villages that once existed in this so-called Achdorfer Tal (Achdorf Valley ) have fallen victim to the unstable subsoil and been abandoned. Clearly visible are three large landslides: the Eschach Slip (Eschacher Bergsturz) on the eastern precipice of the Scheffheu (1880, 1940 and 1966), the 1966 landslide at Eichberg with its resulting waterfall and the 1976 landslide on repeatedly closed Wellblechsträßle at the foot of the Buchberg. The larger villages of Aselfingen and Achdorf lie at the mouths of the Aubach valley (with its Mundelfingen Waterfall and ruins of Hardegg) and Krottenbach valley. To the east, prominent mountain landforms of the Eichberg (913.6 metres) and the Buchberg (879.9 metres) tower above the valley; between them the upper Aitrach valley ends 170 metres above the Wutach valley seemingly in mid-air, forming the Blumberg Gate (Blumberger Pforte). Below the former castle of Blumberg the Schleifebach Falls cascade into the valley (4, 9 and 5 metres high).

=== Lower Gorge (Wutachflühen) in the Main Muschelkalk ===
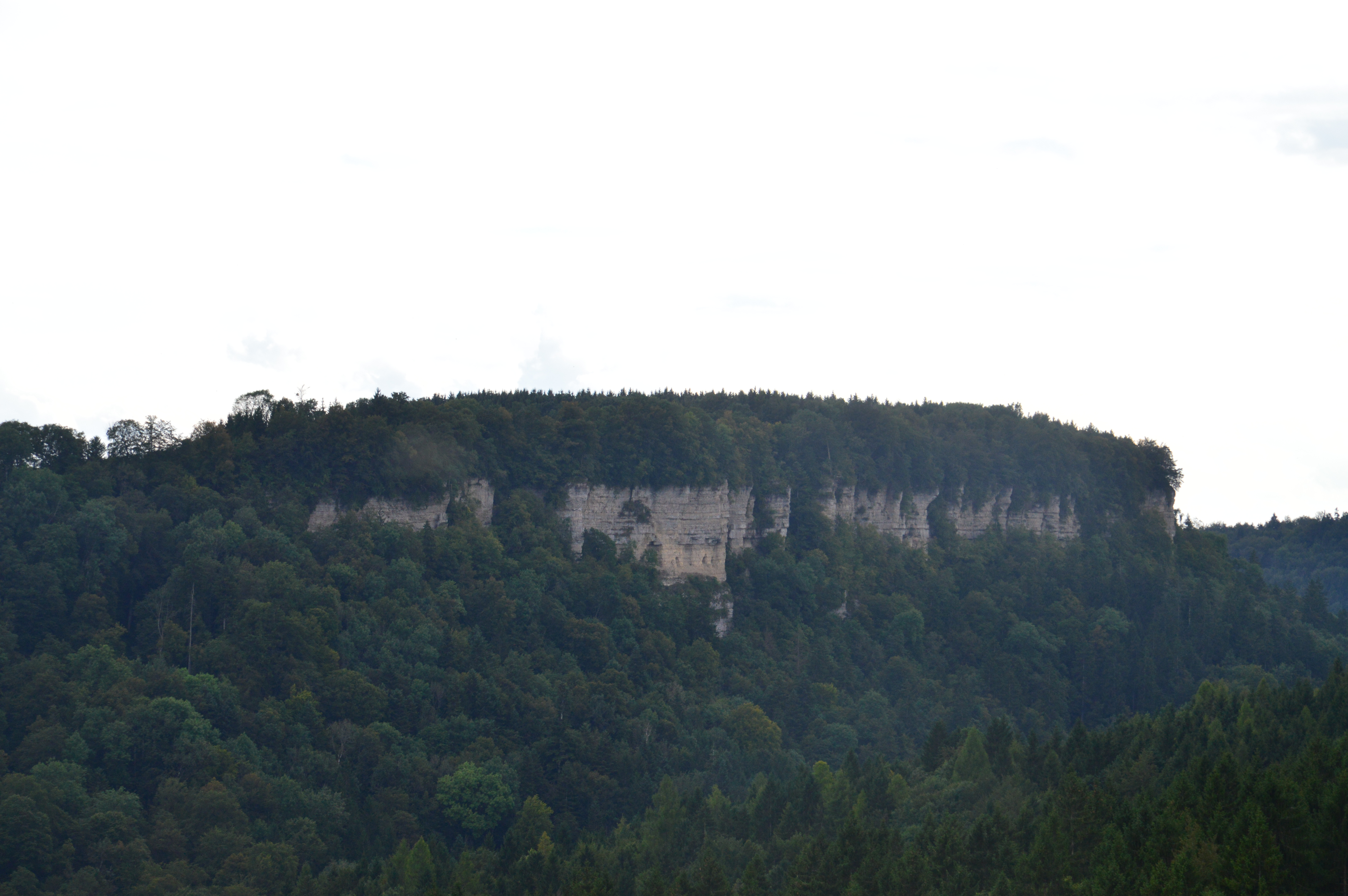
The left gorge face of the Flühen

After turning sharply at the prominent Wutach Knee (Wutachknie) the Wutach crosses and important fault line, south of which the Upper Muschelkalk, which descends deeply, accompanies the upper valley slopes once more in the form of rock faces. In this third gorge, the Flühen (Alemannic: rock faces), the dimensions of the gorge and its rock faces reach their greatest extent. Here lies the heavily fissured Swabian Jura with its highest precipice, the Walenhalde(350 m). The Flühen are, however, exhibit less variety and were did not become a tourist attraction until the opening of the Wutach Valley Railway, which crosses over them.

The narrow valley begins with the little Letterngraben Waterfall on the right hand side of the valley and with waterfalls in the Sackpfeiferdobel and Sturzdobel (15 metres, tufa crags) on the left hand side. The actual Wutachflühen are a 3-kilometre-long, up to 85-metre-high rock wall in the left hand side; it is the greatest outcropping of the Upper Muschelkalk in Germany. Rock pinnacles such as the Lunzistein (also Brautfluh, about 15 metres high) or the Mannheimer Felsen break out of the jagged rocks. Opposite, on a free-standing, 30-metre-high rock plateau, are the ruins of Blumegg Castle. The counterpart of the Gutach Bridge at the start of the Lower Gorge is the viaduct of the Wutach Valley Railway, which marks the lower end of the Wutach gorges.

=== Gauchach Gorge ===
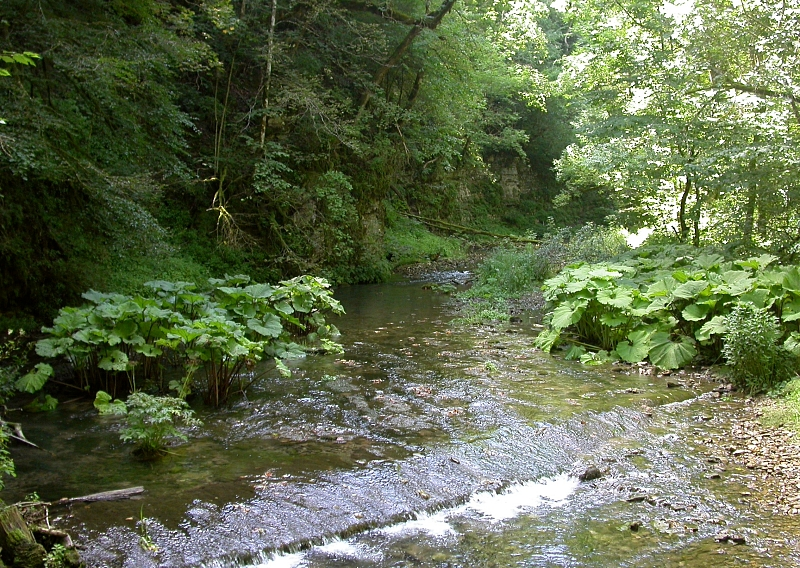
Butterbur drifts in the Gauchach Gorge

The most important side gorge, the Gauchach Gorge, which contains the Gauchach stream, is characterised by its narrowness and its cascade-like stream bed formed in the beds of the Upper Muschelkalk. Roughly in the middle of the gorge it is joined near the old mill of Bergmühle by the rather straight, rugged ravine known as the Engeschlucht through which the Tränkebach stream runs. Together with the Gauchach and Wutach Gorge it forms the Bachheim Gorge Rectangle (Bachheimer Schluchtenviereck). Here, too, at low water it drains away underground to the Wutach.

After the valley broadens out below the Gauchach Viaduct (which carries the Bundesstraße 31) the first narrow section begins near the restored and functional mill of Guggenmühle. The actual gorge begins near the castle ruins of the Grünburg (wall remains measuring 15 × 12 m) and the Lochmühle mill, which was destroyed in a flood. Opposite stands the Grünburg Chapel with a votive picture of a flood in 1804 and again in 1895. Below the ruins of the Neuenburg, which is barely recognisable following a landslip, the Burgmühle Hiking Hostel run by the Friends of Nature acts as a tourist base. In the lowest part of the gorge an educational path leads past impressive tufas and communities of giant horsetail.

== See also ==
- List of canyons

== Literature ==
- Dieter Buck: Fundort Natur - Natursehenswürdigkeiten zwischen Schwarzwald und Schwäbischer Alb. Cadolzburg, 1999 ISBN 978-3-89716-085-9
- Gerhard Fuchs: Wanderwege und Naturschutz der Wutachschlucht. In: Die Wutach. Naturkundliche Monographie einer Flußlandschaft. = Natur u. Landschaftsschutzgebiete Bad.-Württ. Vol. 6, pp. 567–575, Freiburg, 1988 ISBN 3-88251-135-4
- Gerhard Fuchs: Natur- und Landschaftsschutz im Schwarzwald. In: Der Schwarzwald. Beiträge zur Landeskunde = Veröffentlichung des Alemannischen Instituts Freiburg i. Br., No. 47, pp. 489–500, 1989 ISBN 3-7826-0047-9
- Rudolf Gauss: Die Schmetterlinge (Lepidoptera) des Wutachgebietes. In: Die Wutach. Naturkundliche Monographie einer Flußlandschaft. = Natur u. Landschaftsschutzgebiete Bad.-Württ. Vol. 6, pp. 435–439, Freiburg, 1988 ISBN 3-88251-135-4
- Geographisch-Kartographisches Institut Meyer [publ.]: Meyers Naturführer - Südschwarzwald Mannheim, 1989 ISBN 3-411-02775-4
- C. Hebestreit: Wutach- und Feldbergregion - Ein geologischer Führer. Stuttgart, 1999 ISBN 3-13-117531-1
- Fritz Hockenjos (ed.): Wanderführer durch die Wutach und Gauchachschlucht. Freiburg, 1973
- Fritz Hockenjos: Die Wutachschlucht. Konstanz, 1964, ISBN 3-7930-0226-8
- Landesanstalt für Umweltschutz (publ.): Die Wutach - Naturkundliche Monographie einer Flusslandschaft. = Natur- u. Landsch.-Schutzgeb. Baden-Württ., Vol. 6, Karlsruhe, 1988 ISBN 3-88251-135-4
- Gerhard Lang: Die Vegetationsgeschichte der Wutachschlucht und ihrer Umgebung. In: Die Wutach. Naturkundliche Monographie einer Flußlandschaft. = Natur u. Landschaftsschutzgebiete Bad.-Württ. Vol. 6, pp. 323–349, Freiburg, 1988 ISBN 3-88251-135-4
- Ekkehard Liehl: Morphologie des Wutachgebietes. In: Die Wutach. Naturkundliche Monographie einer Flußlandschaft. = Natur u. Landschaftsschutzgebiete Bad.-Württ. Vol. 6, pp. 1–30, Freiburg, 1988 ISBN 3-88251-135-4.
- Erich Oberdorfer: Die Pflanzenwelt des Wutachgebietes. In: Die Wutach. Naturkundliche Monographie einer Flußlandschaft. = Natur u. Landschaftsschutzgebiete Bad.-Württ. Vol. 6, pp. 261–321, Freiburg, 1988 ISBN 3-88251-135-4.
- Willi Paul: Die Naturgeschichte der Wutachschlucht - Geologie. In: Fritz Hockenjos (ed.): Wanderführer durch die Wutach und Gauchachschlucht. Freiburg (Rombach), 1973, pp. 11–39
- Gilbert Rahm: Die ältere Vereisung des Schwarzwaldes und der angrenzenden Gebiete. In: Der Schwarzwald. Beiträge zur Landeskunde. = Veröffentlichung des Alemannischen Instituts Freiburg i. Br., No. 47, pp. 36–58, 1989 ISBN 3-7826-0047-9.
- Martin Schnetter: Die Vögel des Wutachgebietes. In: Die Wutach. Naturkundliche Monographie einer Flußlandschaft. = Natur u. Landschaftsschutzgebiete Bad.-Württ. Vol. 6, pp. 447–474, Freiburg, 1988 ISBN 3-88251-135-4.
- Herbert Schwarzmann: Hydrographie des Wutachgebietes. In: Die Wutach. Naturkundliche Monographie einer Flußlandschaft. = Natur u. Landschaftsschutzgebiete Bad.-Württ. 6: 221-226, Freiburg, 1988 ISBN 3-88251-135-4.
- Otti Wilmanns: Exkursionsführer Schwarzwald – eine Einführung in Landschaft und Vegetation. Stuttgart, Ulmer 2001, ISBN 3-8252-2180-6.

== Media ==
- Reinhard Zeese: Geographisch/geomorphologischer Ausflug in die Vergangenheit - Erlebnislandschaft zwischen Rhein und Bodensee (with river capture of the Wutach), DVD, LEB-Brühl 2002
