= Gauchach =

River in Germany

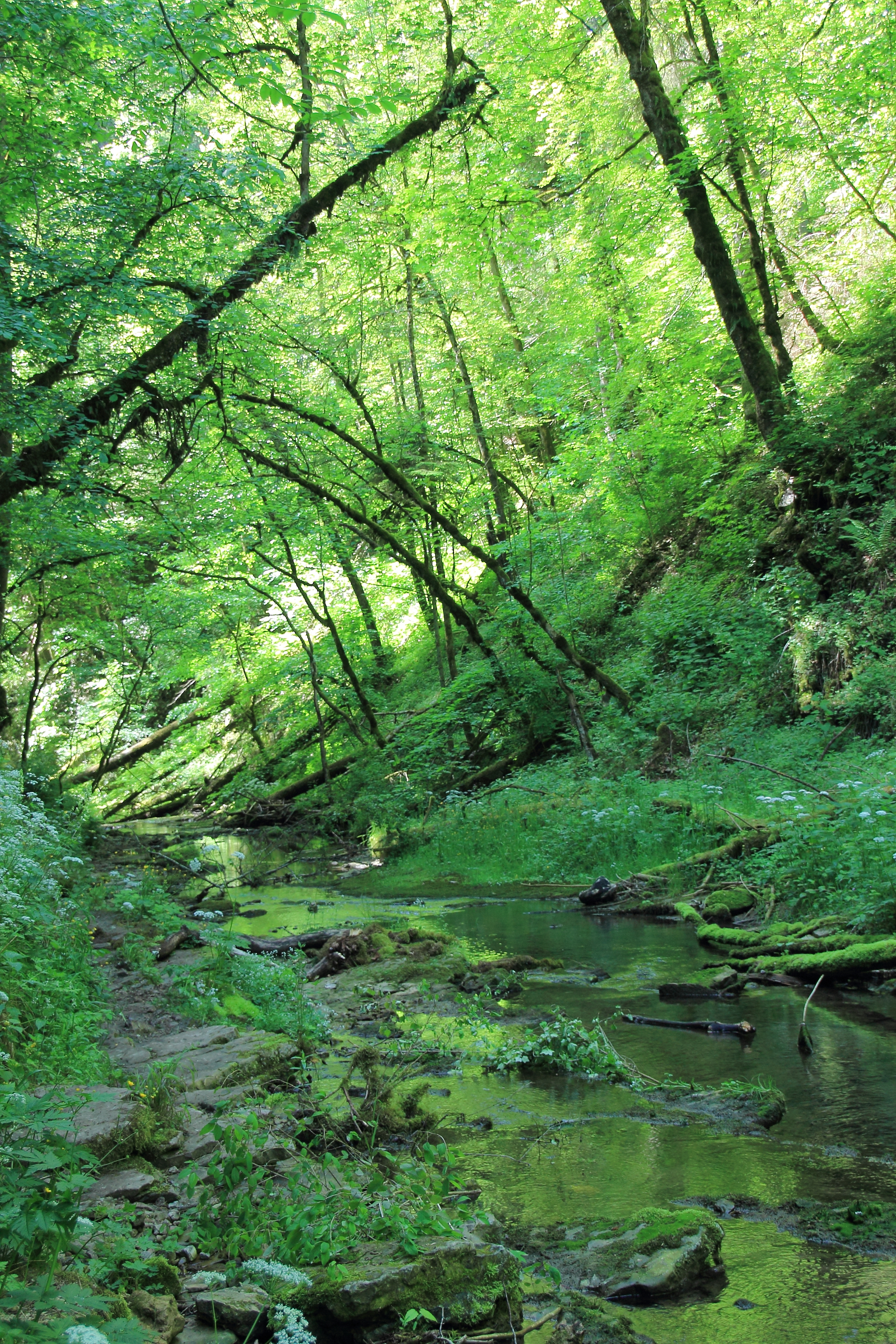
- The Gauchach within the Gauchach Gorge

Location
- Country: Germany
- State: Baden-Württemberg

Physical characteristics
- Mouth
  - location: Wutach
  - coordinates: 47.8540°N 8.4392°E
- Length: 20.8 km (12.9 mi)

Basin features
- Progression: Wutach→ Rhine→ North Sea

The Gauchach is a stream and tributary of the river Wutach in Baden-Württemberg, Germany. It runs through the spectacular Gauchach Gorge.

== See also ==
- List of rivers of Baden-Württemberg
