= Wutach (river) =

River in Germany

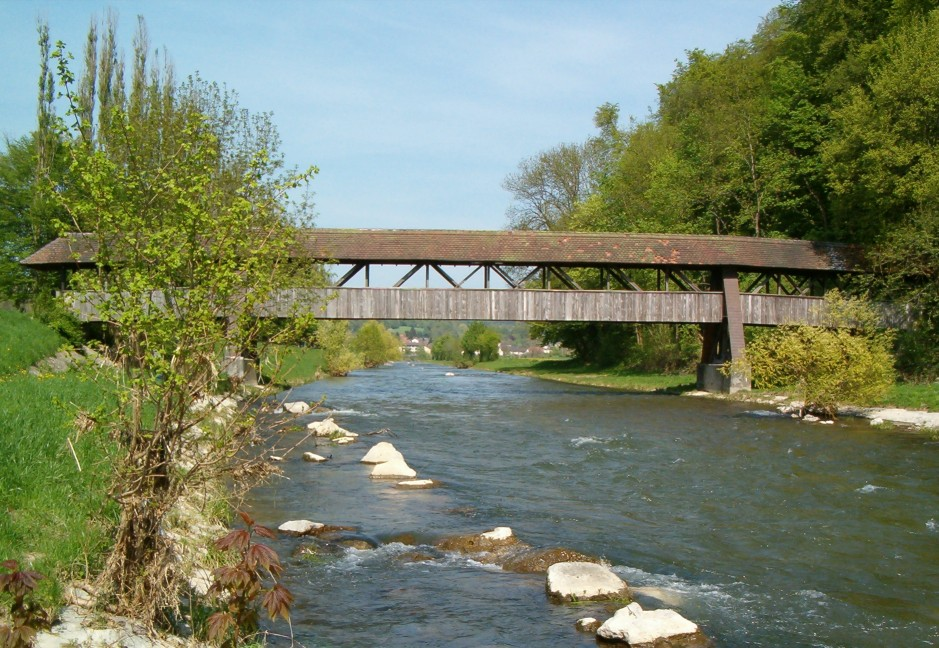
- The Wutach at Tiengen between the mouths of the Steina and Schlücht

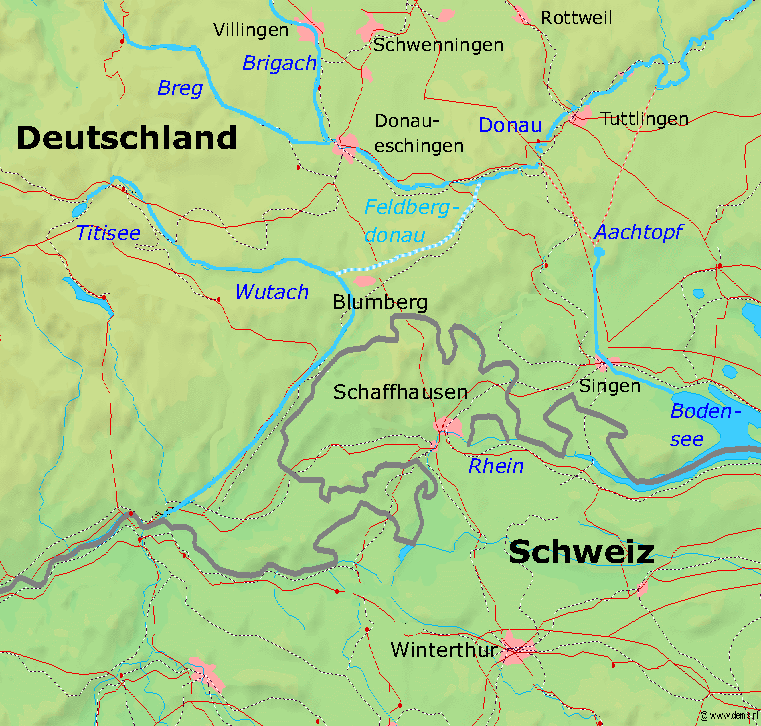
- Map showing the course of the Wutach and its relation the Rhine (Rhein) and Danube (Donau)

Location
- Countries: Germany and Switzerland

Physical characteristics
- Source
  - location: On the Seebuck (Black Forest) as the Seebach
  - coordinates: 47°52′14″N 8°00′59″E
  - elevation: 1,440 m (4,720 ft)
- Mouth
  - location: The Rhine near Waldshut-Tiengen
  - coordinates: 47°36′51″N 8°14′59″E
  - elevation: 315 m (1,033 ft)
- Length: 91.1 km (56.6 mi)
- Basin size: 1,139.3 km^{2} (439.9 sq mi)
- Discharge
  - average: 16.1 m^{3}/s (570 cu ft/s)

Basin features
- Progression: Rhine→ North Sea
- Tributaries
  - left: Kotbach (mouth river of the Klettgau rivers, the Klingengraben and the Schwarzbach)
  - right: Schlücht, Steina
- Waterbodies: Feldsee, Titisee

The Wutach (German pronunciation: [ˈvuːtax]) is a river, 91 kilometres long, in the southeastern part of the Black Forest in the German state of Baden-Württemberg. It is a right-hand tributary of the Rhine. In its lower reaches it flows for about 6 kilometres along the border with the canton of Schaffhausen, Switzerland.

== Name ==
The name Wutach means "furious water", referring to the whitewater rapids in the gorge. Wut is recognisably cognate to a modern German word for anger; ach, which forms part of the names of many rivers in the region, comes from an old Celtic word for water, cognate with Latin aqua.

== Course ==
The river changes its name twice before it discharges into the High Rhine near Waldshut:

It rises in the Southern Black Forest as the Seebach in a highland hollow known as the Grüble, only a few metres below the summit of the Seebuck, a subpeak of the Black Forest's highest mountain, the Feldberg. Shortly thereafter it drops in three cascades through a height of 62 metres down the Feldsee Waterfall into the rocky cirque lake of the Feldsee. Heading east-northeast, the stream then follows the glacially formed Bärental valley through the municipality of Feldberg to Lake Titisee. During this stretch it is joined by the Sägenbach, which rises on the Baldenweger Buck on the Feldberg. More than 70% of the average water volume of both streams is siphoned off before their confluence and diverted to the Schluchseewerk hydropower station. As a result, at the Bärental Gauge above the just under 5-metre-high Seebach Waterfall, the Seebach only has a volumetric flow of 0.3 m^{3}/s instead of its natural 0.8 m^{3}/s. Below the little waterfall the Seebach enters a flat valley basin which has filled the silted-up, upper part of the Titisee since the last ice age. The stream now flows in wide meanders through the bogs of the nature reserve before reaching Lake Titisee.

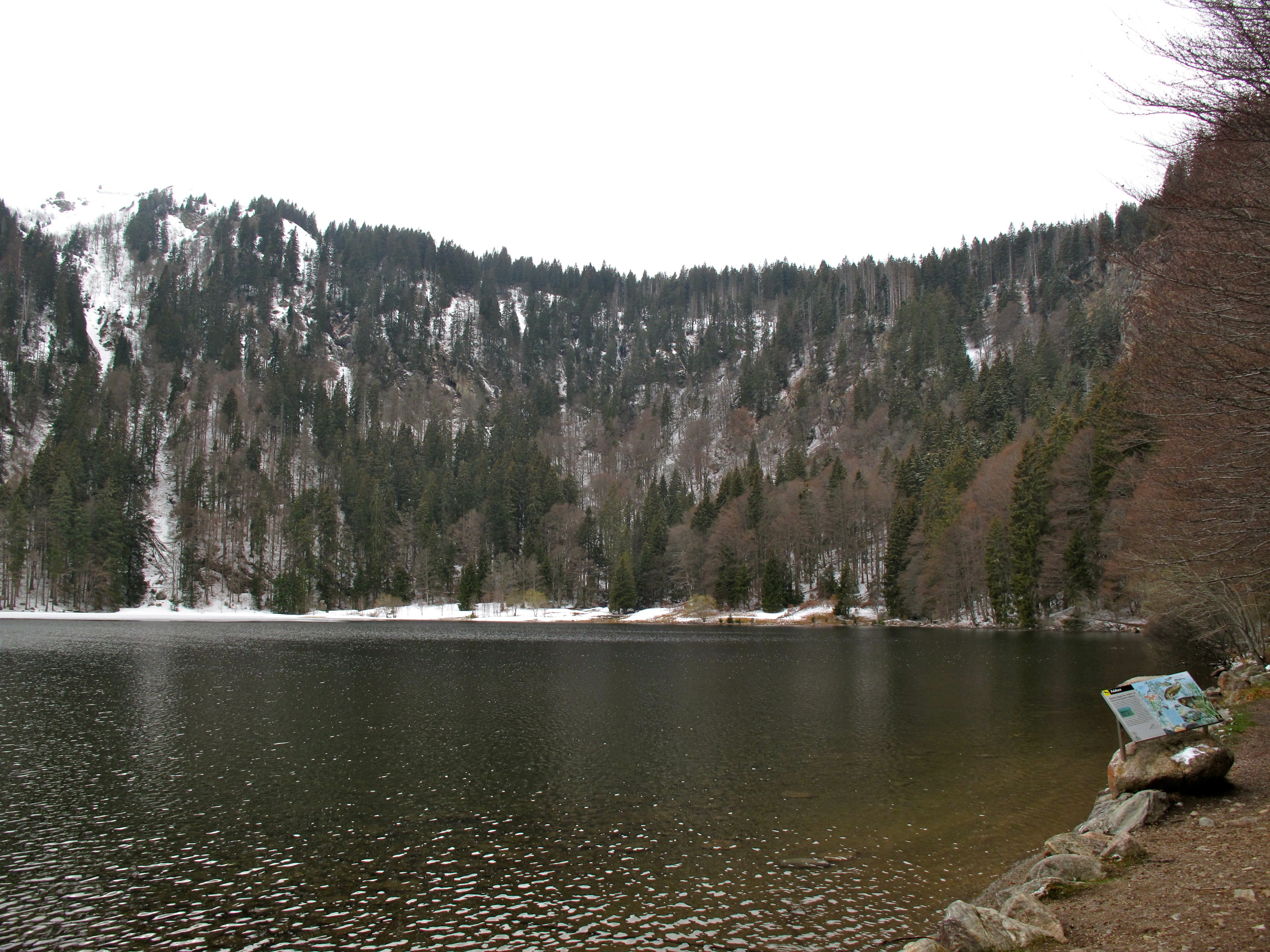
The Feldsee and Feldsee Waterfall (centre)

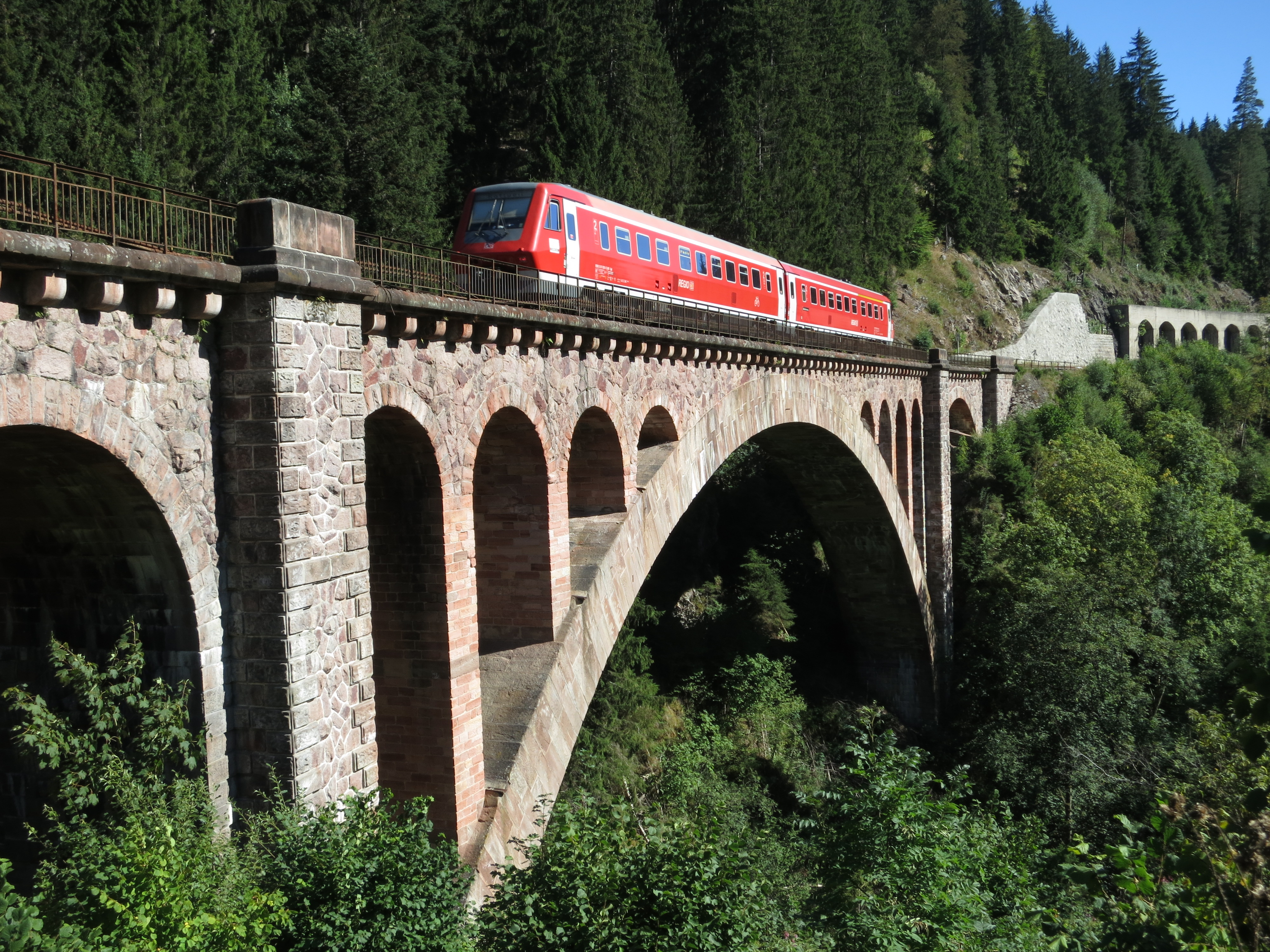
The Gutach Bridge on the Höllental Railway

The sluggishly flowing meadow river originating from the Titisee is called the Gutach ("good stream"). Before reaching Neustadt, it takes a 90° angle to the right, heading southeast towards the almost equally large Josbach/Langenordnach. Below the town, two large bridges cross the valley: the Gutach Viaduct carrying the B 31 and the Gutach Bridge with the Höllental Railway. From here on, the river rushes through an ever deepening gorge.

From the confluence where the river acquires the name Wutach, it flows ESE through a series of three gorges with a total length of more than 30 km (19 mi) and a maximum depth of 160 m (520 ft) (see Wutach Gorge) which has long been a tourist attraction. Between the second and the last part of the gorge, near the village of Achdorf in the municipality of Blumberg, it takes a sharp turn (known as the Wutachknie or Knee of the Wutach), and subsequently flows SW to join the Rhine near Tiengen in the town of Waldshut-Tiengen.

At the Wutachknie the river is very close to the headwaters of the Danube, until the last glacial period the upper course of the Wutach was the headstream of the Danube catchment (called Feldbergdonau).

The lower Wutach valley is straight, wide-bottomed and very densely populated. The river forms the border between Germany and Switzerland for two sections that total about 6 kilometres in length, after which it is canalised. The most important settlements in this part of the valley are the town of Stühlingen and the villages of Eggingen and Wutöschingen.

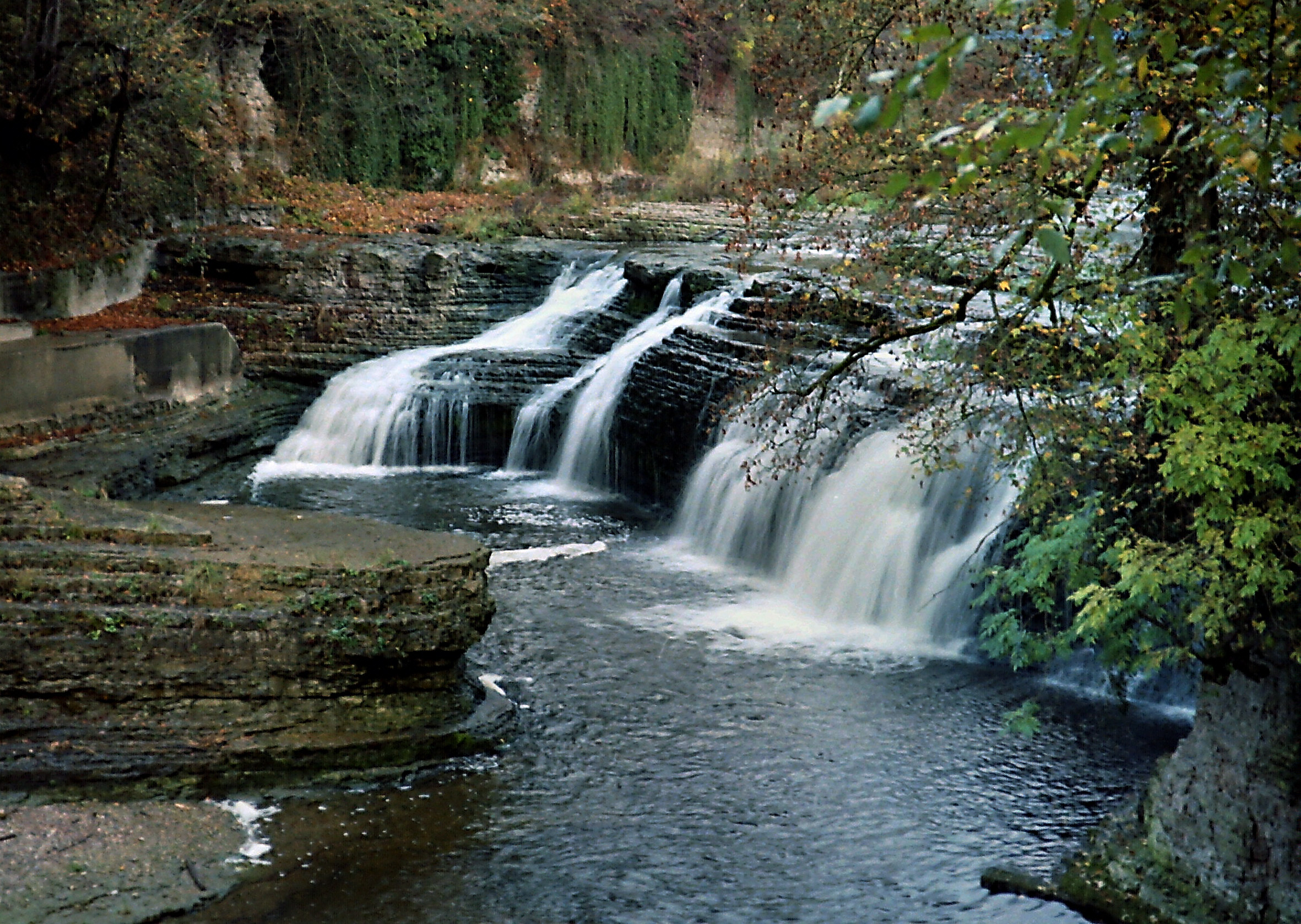
Wutach Waterfall in Lauchringen

Before Lauchringen the Wutach turns again in the same direction as a tributary, this time the Klingengrabens/Kotbach which arrives in a broad valley from the Klettgau region. In Unterlauchringen the Wutach forms one of the largest waterfalls in Germany, the power of which is why the Lauffenmühle was built here, the largest industrial concern on the Wutach. The largest town in the Wutach valley is nearby Tiengen, where the Wutach is joined by the Kotbach from the Black Forest as well as its most important tributaries, the Steina and Schlücht. The Wutach finally empties into the High Rhine between Küssaberg-Kadelburg and Koblenz, a little below the rapids of the Kadelburger/Koblenzer Laufen.

The stretch of the Wutach is the site of two remarkable railways. The upper stretch of the first gorge is crossed and followed by the so-called Höllentalbahn. The valley just below the third gorge is the site of the Wutach Valley Railway, officially known in German as the Wutachtalbahn but commonly known as the Sauschwänzlebahn (pigtail) because it proceeds in a series of tight turns, including crossing back over itself, in order to make a substantial increase in height without exceeding a 1:100 gradient.

== Catchment ==
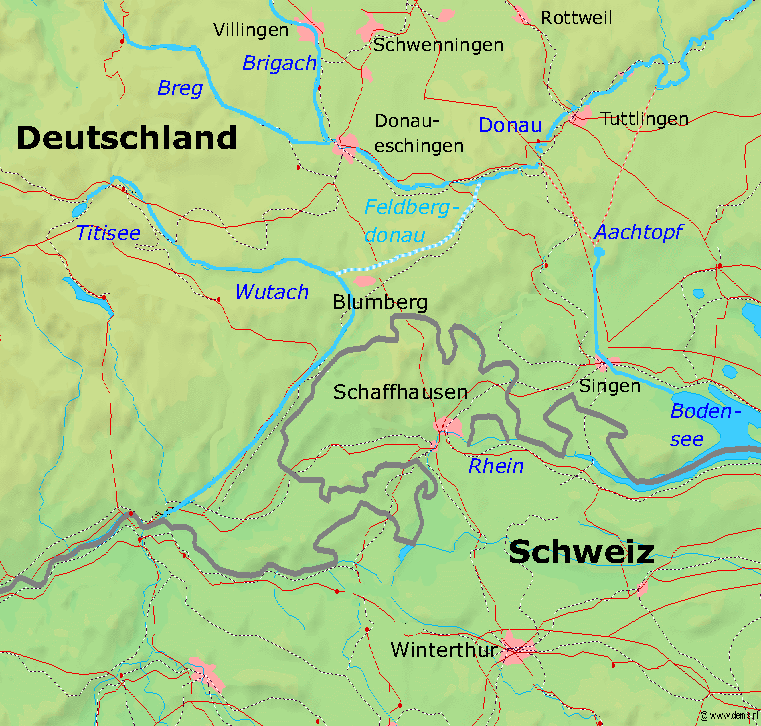
Course of the Wutach and the hydrographical situation on the Danube

The Wutach drains almost the entire south-eastern slopes of the Black Forest. There, its waters first flow through glacially formed valley troughs, carved into the crystalline rocks of High Black Forest. Here are the lakes of the Feldsee and Titisee (Gutach), Windgfällweiher (Haslach), Schluchsee (Schwarza) and Schlüchtsee (Schlücht). After flowing through several very narrow ravines, the streams reach the edge of the Black Forest and the sandstone, limestone and mudstone series of the South German Scarplands. The lower course of the Wutach, which bends to head southwest, runs past the foot of the dominant White Jurassic step of the Swabian Jura and of Randen, at right angles to the dip slope and thus collects several Black forest rivers. The Kotbach, flowing from the other side to the east and parallel to the High Rhine, follows an ice age Rhine channel (the Klettgaurinne). The Wutach only drains parts of the Black Forest and thus resembles the Enz in this respect.

The average annual discharge depths of the catchment area vary considerably; ranging from over 1,100 mm in the High Black Forest to less than 300 mm in the Klettgau. The visible depth of the Wutach in its river bed, is much lower than would be expected of a river than under natural circumstances drained a catchment of 1,140 km^{2}. This is due to the water siphoned off for the Schluchseewerk power station, which particularly affects its largest tributary, the Schlücht

Owing to its riverbed gradient of, on average, 13 ‰, critical high water often occurs on the Wutach. A well-known historical lithograph shows the valley floor at the Stühlinger Zwirnerei completely covered by water. Its lower reaches were therefore canalised and dyked in order to provide flood protection at the beginning of the 20th century. In the meantime, even former floodplains have been utilised for new construction and industrial areas.

== River history ==
The lower Wutach flows along the line of the valley once occupied by the much more powerful upper Ancient Danube (Urdonau), but in the opposite direction. At the turn of the Miocene/Pliocene epochs, at a time when the Black Forest was already being uplifted but the Rhine Graben was not as low as it is today, the Danube had its source in the area of what is today the upper Rhone. This river system fragmented and most of it gradually became a network of tributaries of the Rhine river system (For more information, see Wutach Gorge). Latterly, the upper and middle reaches of today's Wutach formed the Feldberg Danube, the upper course of the Danube. But after the watershed between the aggraded Feldberg Danube and the downward-cutting Ancient Wutach, which existed until the last ice age, had been severely eroded, the Feldberg Danube broke out to the south-west into the Rhine valley some 20,000 to 70,000 years ago, forming the striking Wutachknie at Blumberg. Because of the relatively steep gradient in its new direction of flow towards the Rhine, the river carved out the deep, roughly 30-kilometre-long, Wutach Gorge into the plateau, a process that continues today. It has excavated about two cubic kilometres of rock. The valley slopes tend to slip; this makes the Wutach Gorge even more of a transportation obstacle than its, in places, steep relief would suggest and makes the maintenance of roads and tracks, and even of hiking trails, expensive.

The Aitrach flows in the former riverbed of the old Feldberg Danube from its stream capture point to the mouth of the present-day Danube near Kirchen-Hausen. In its uppermost, very flat valley section at Blumberg raised bogs were formed.

In its upper course, the Wutach (as the "Gutach") forms another knee; it flows into the former main valley, which began at about the Kandel, but was cut off and redirected a long time ago by the Wild Gutach. Similar river bends in the course of the tributaries from the Black Forest also show (much earlier) re-direction, most strikingly the Schwarza leaving the Schluchsee transversely to the direction of the valley.

In the lower reaches of the Wutach, the Wutach valley flows into the 'Klettgaurinne', and the Wutach then follows the direction of the Kotbach. Until the end of the Riss Ice Age, some 200,000 years ago, the Ancient Rhine flowed westward through the Klettgau here, instead of the little Klingengraben and Kotbach. At the Ettikoner Lauffen it rejoined its old river bed. Only towards the end of the Würm glaciation did it move his course from Schaffhausen southwards, resulting in the well-known Rhine Falls there. At Rheinau Abbey the meander known as the Rheinschlaufen ("Rhine Loop") was formed.

== Nature reserves ==
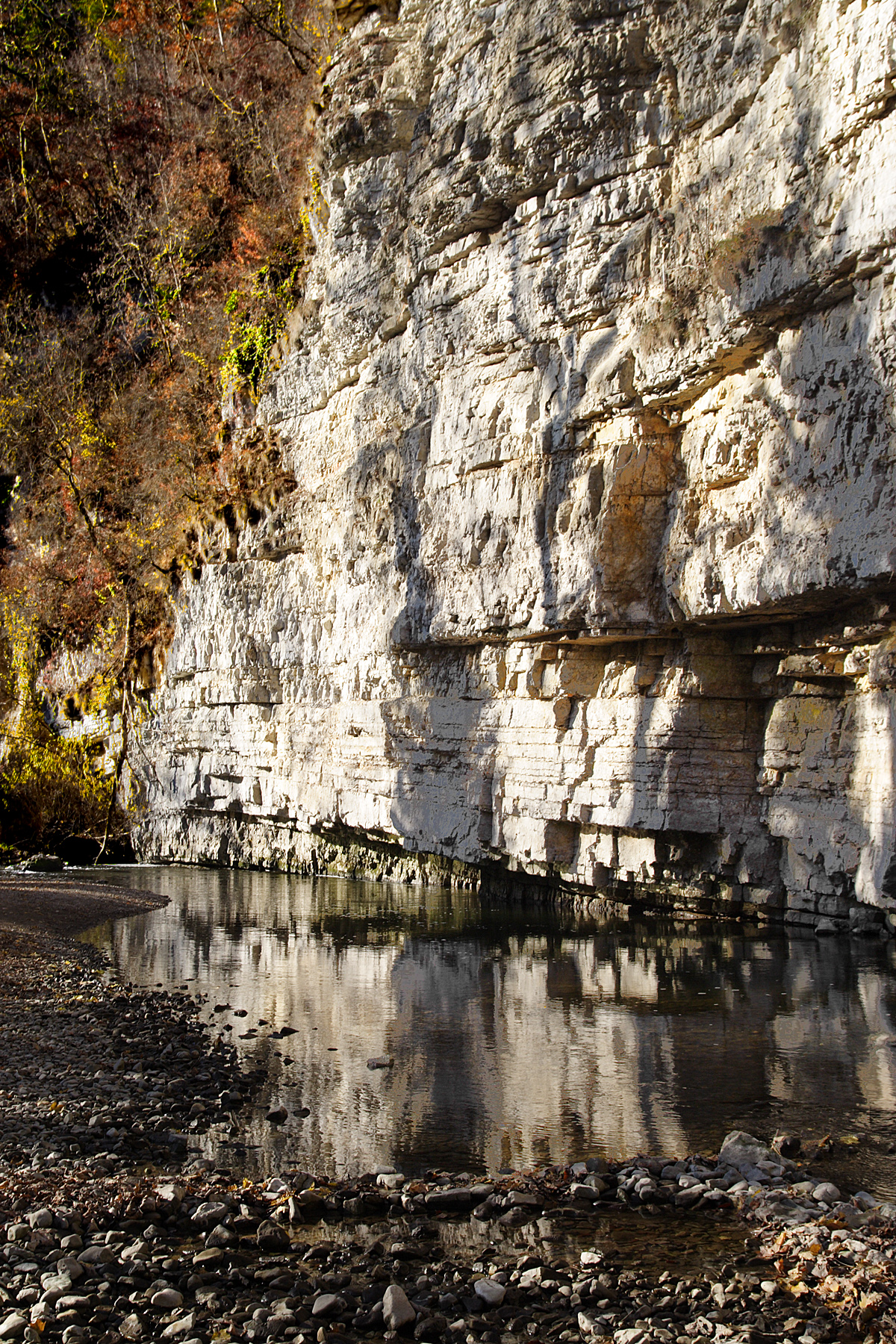
Muschelkalk outcrop, start of the karstified Middle Wutach Gorge (the waters have partly infiltrated the bed here)

About a third of the course of the Wutach is protected for conservation reasons.

The river rises in the nature reserve of Feldberg, the largest in Baden-Württemberg.

One of the oldest nature reserves in the country has been the Wutach Gorge, one of the last wild river landscapes of Central Europe, which have major historical, geological and ecological significance. Nearly every rock occurring in Southern Germany is represented in the gorge, which is one of the most species-rich and intensively studied natural areas in Central Europe. A full-time nature conservation warden looks after the area, balancing the interests of up to 100,000 visitors during the summer months with the requirements of nature and landscape protection (including guided walks). One of the peculiarities of the Middle Gorge is the infiltration of the waters of the Wutach into the muschelkalk. At low water, the river can be dry up completely for a 1.3 kilometre stretch, until its waters appear, cataract-like (probably completely) again.

Further river sections, which are protected, are the natural river meadows above Stühlingen on the border with Switzerland (extensive horsetail colonies) and its estuary on the Rhine.

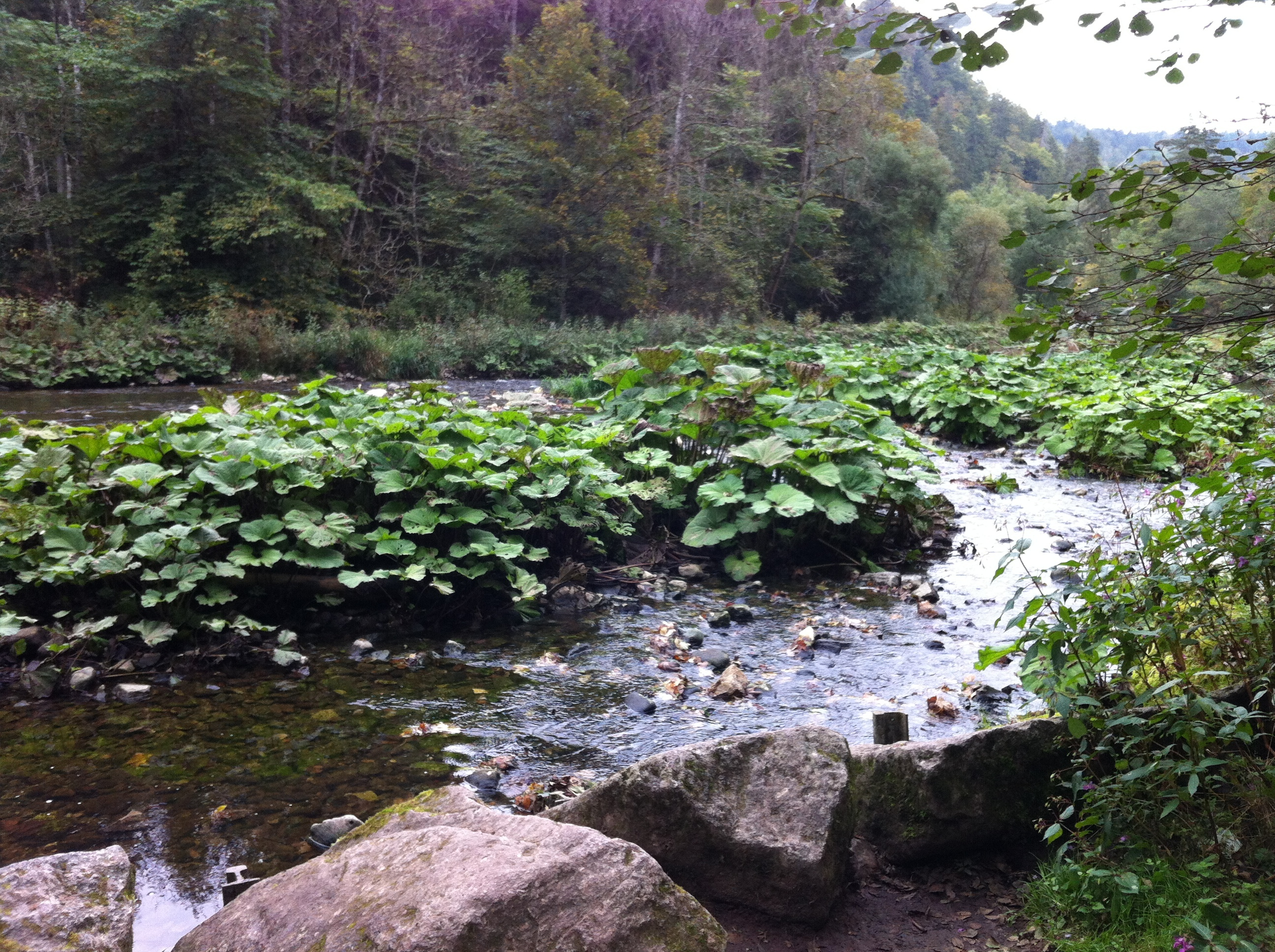
Butterbur colony on the Wutach

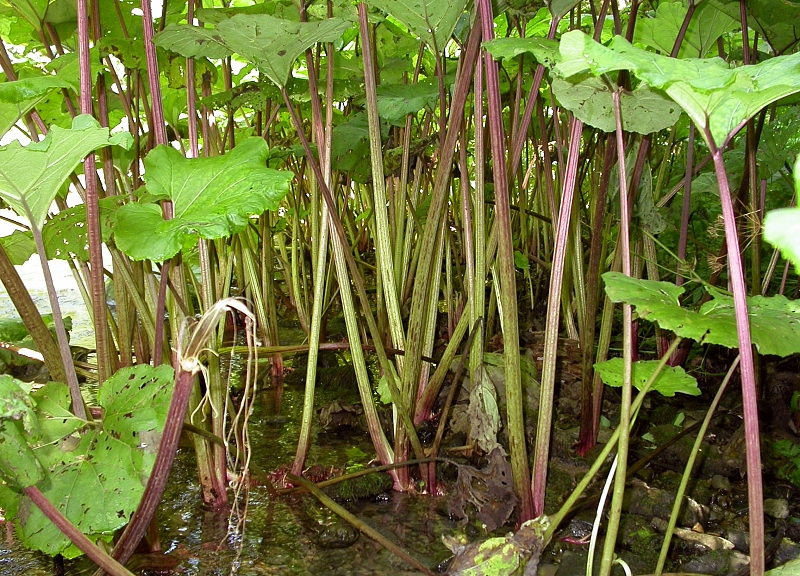
Butterbur colony

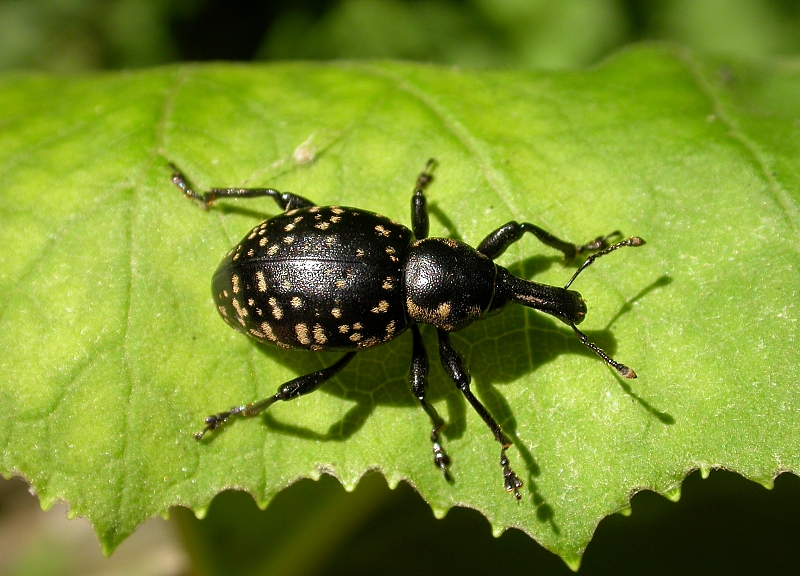
Weevil (Liparus) on butterbur

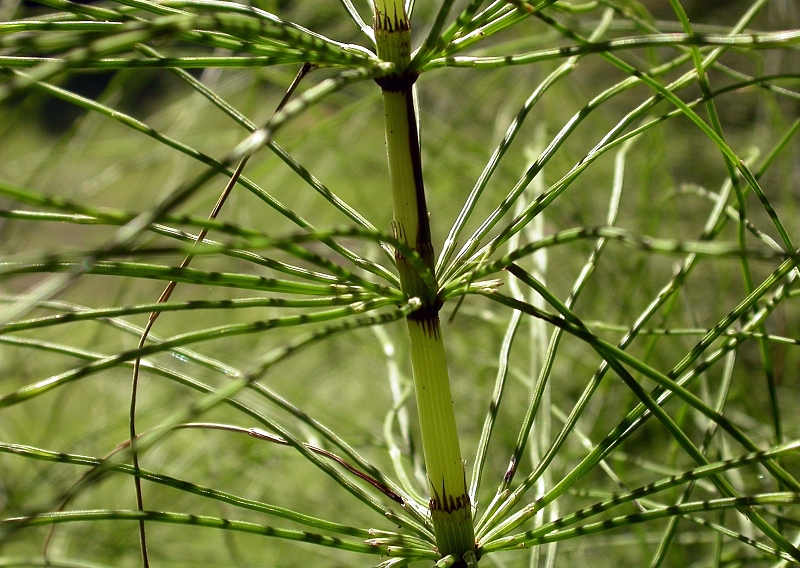
Giant horsetail

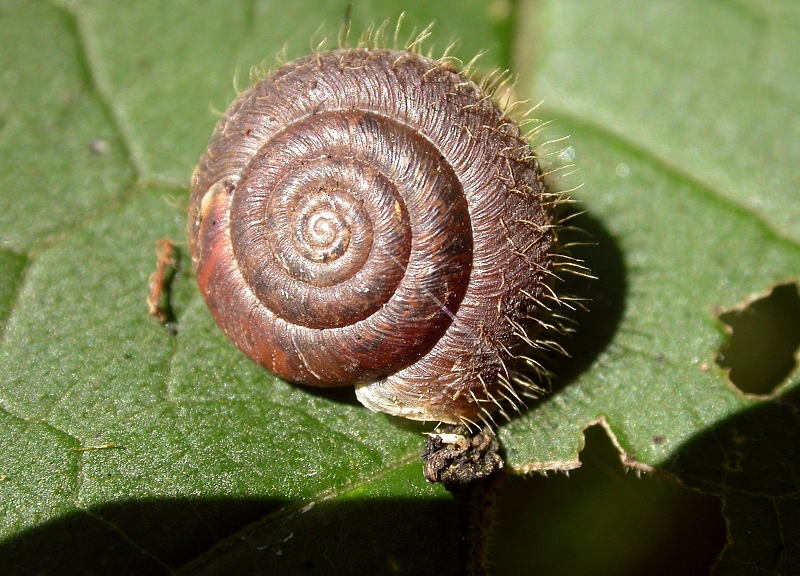
Hairy snail (Trochulus)

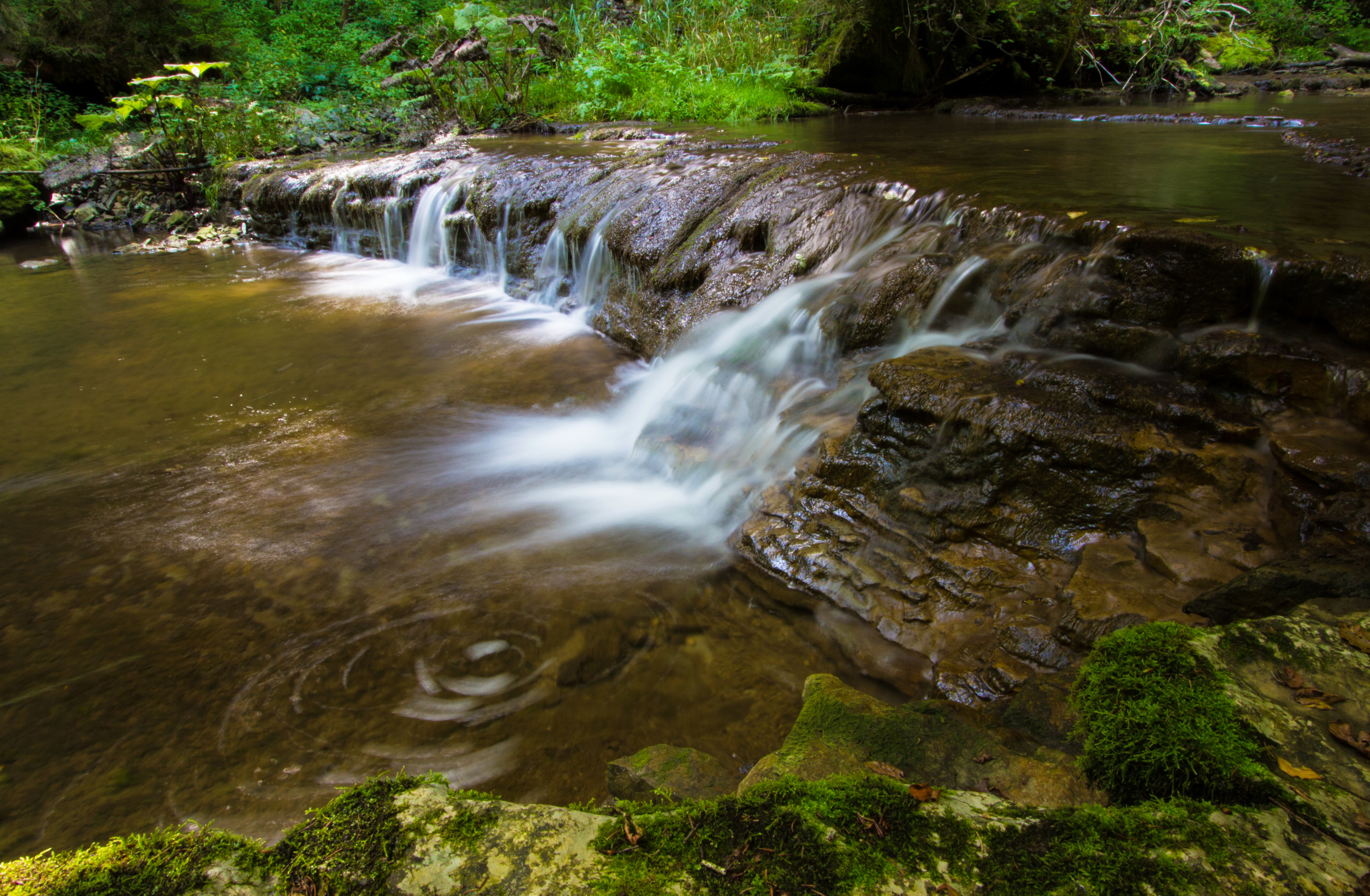
Muschelkalk beds in the Gauchach riverbed

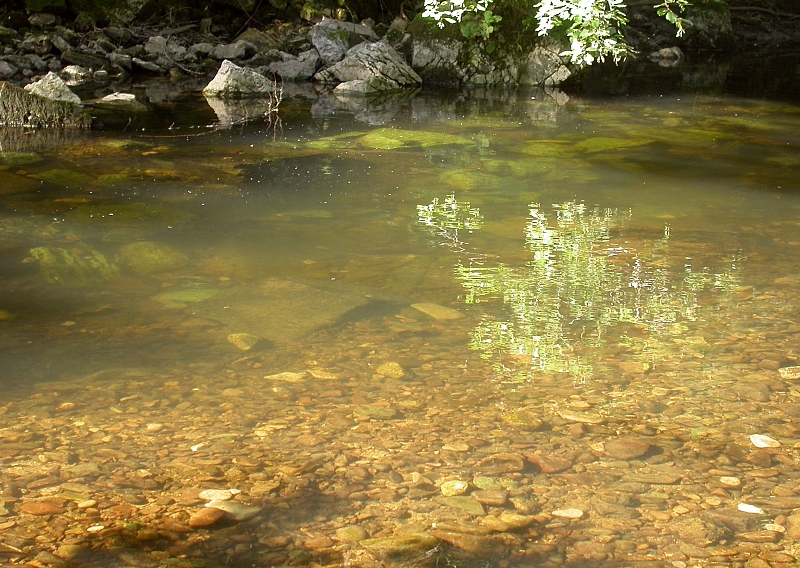
The Wutach

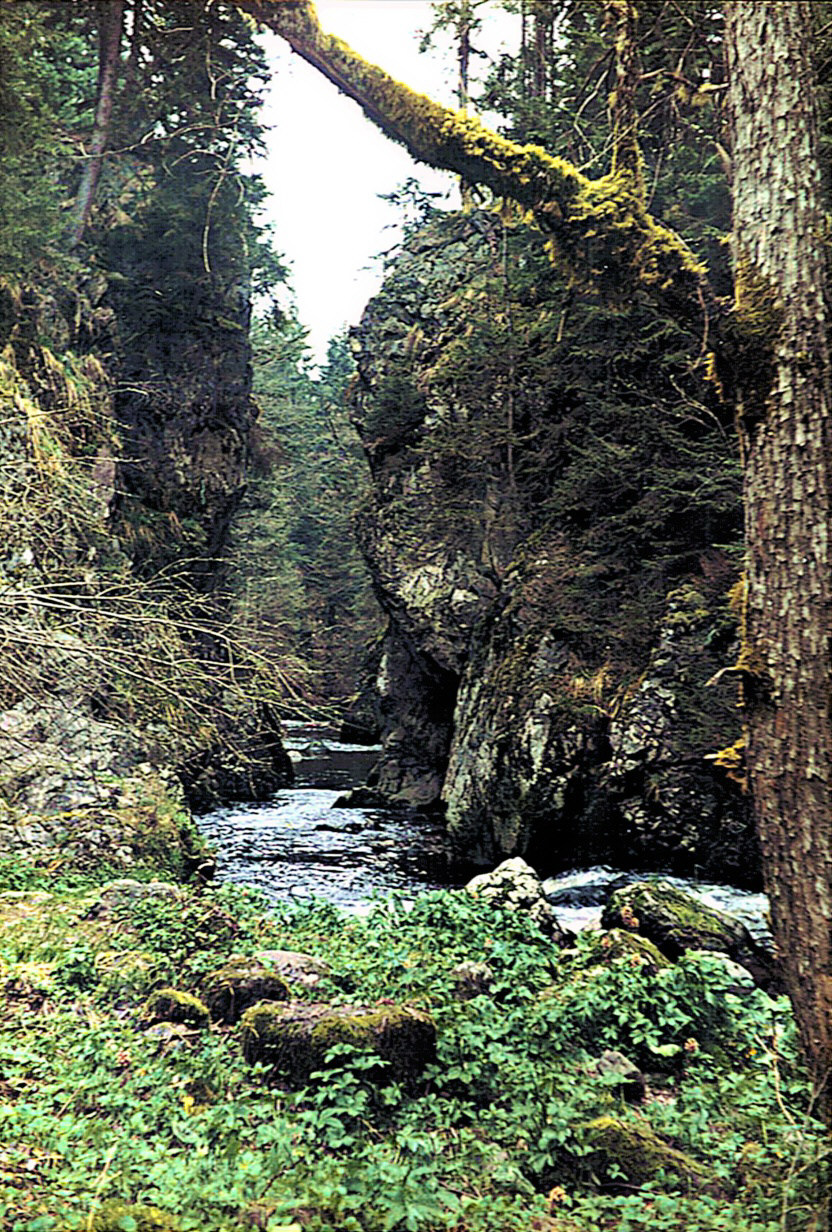
Haslach Gorge with the Rechenfelsen rocks

== Cultural landscape ==
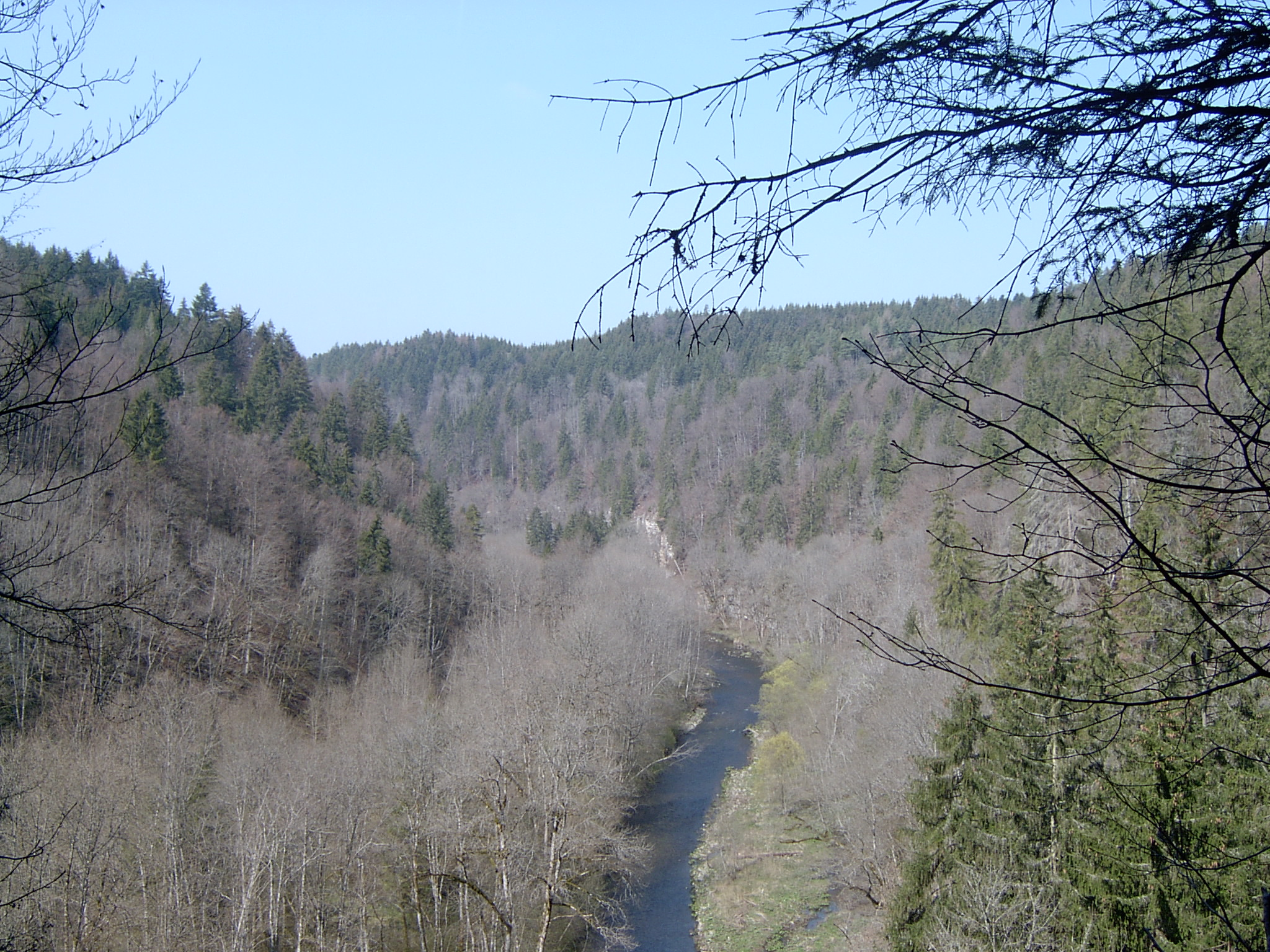
The Wutach Gorge near Reiselfingen

From a natural region perspective, only part of the Wutach is within the Black Forest. The central Wutach land with the middle and lower Wutach Gorge is outside of the forest. However, as in the Baar, one can see that the culture here relates to that of the Black Forest, and not only with regard to tourism. This is, in part due to their former common affiliation with the historic state of Baden. The Wutach Valley Railway is often counted as one of the technically remarkable Black Forest lines. The Wutach area below Stühlingen is part of the Klettgau and the High Rhine region. In the area of the gorge, the Wutach separates the Lake Constance Alemannic German dialect region north of the gorge, from the High Alemannic German-speaking region south of it. This is particularly noticeable in the different way the letter k is spoken. On the northern side they say Kind ("child") and Kuchi (= Küche or "kitchen"), whilst in the south they say Chind and Chuchi, which is closer to the dialect of neighbouring Switzerland. The locals call those living on the other side of the gorge, the Enne-Wiätler ("far side of the Wutachers").

For two short sections – between Grimmelshofen and Eggingen – the Wutach is the border river between Germany and Switzerland.

The economic heart of the Wutach region is the town of Waldshut-Tiengen. The major industrial enterprises in the Wutacht valley are Sto AG (building materials and systems) in Stühlingen and Lauffenmühle (textile manufacturing) in Lauchringen. The hydropower of the Wutach and its tributaries is used by the Schluchseewerk and by the Wasser- und Elektrizitätswerk Hallau in Wunderklingen to generate energy. In the area of the Black Forest the woodworking industry is still important, even after the closure of the Neustadt Paper Factory in 1989. Between 1624 and ca. 1760, timber was rafted on the Wutach from the area around the Titisee. It was needed in the old iron smeltery of Eberfingen.

The first attempt to exploit the Wutach by building a dam for energy production was made during the Nazi era. The project for the construction of the Wutach Dam, which was approved in 1943, ground to a halt during the Second World War. In 1951, the Schluchseewerk took over the plans and greatly added to them. However, the project resulted in a wide popular protest and was finally rejected for environmental reasons in 1960.

== Territories ==
=== Regions ===
Southern Black Forest and High Rhine

=== Regional planning regions ===
- Schwarzwald-Baar-Heuberg
- Südlicher Oberrhein
- Hochrhein-Bodensee

=== Districts ===
- Breisgau-Hochschwarzwald
- Schwarzwald-Baar-Kreis
- Waldshut

== Tributaries ==
Its tributaries in the area of the Black Forest are:

- Sägenbach (from the Feldberg region, empties into the section of the upper Wutach called the Seebach)
- Langenordnach and Josbach (empties into the section of the upper Wutach called the Gutach)

Other tributaries of the middle reaches also form the Wutach Gorge system. In addition to the large river, the

- Haslach

other rivers which are well known are the

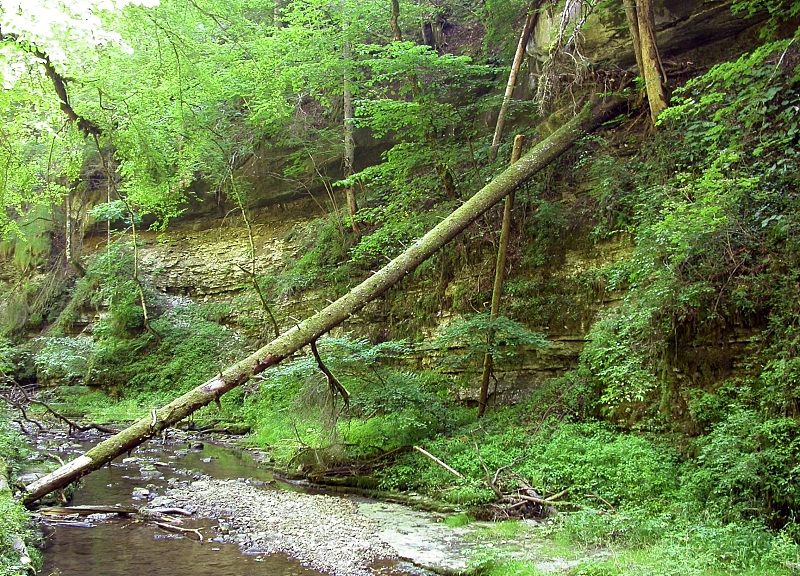
Gauchach

- Rötenbach (from the forested eastern slopes of the Black Forest)
- Lotenbach (from the eastern edge of the Black Forest near Bonndorf through the Lotenbach Gorge (Lotenbachklamm))
- Gauchach (with the largest side gorge, the Gauchach Gorge (Gauchachschlucht) and its side gorges (Tränkebach, Mauchach)
- Schleifebach (from the desolate valley stump of the Blumberger Pforte)

In the lower reaches of the Wutach in the Bade region of Klettgau it is joined by the following streams:

- Weilerbach
- Mühlbach (from the Fützen valley accompanied by the winding Wutach Valley Railway)
- Ehrenbach
- Schleitheimer Bach (from the Randental valley, mainly on Swiss soil)
- Mauchenbach

Not until the last eight kilometres of the Wutach is it joined by its three largest tributaries:

Name	Length	Average Flow Rate	Mouth ca. near	Mouth height (m above NN; ca.)	Proportion of Catchment (ca.)	
Kotbach (with the Schwarzbach)	23.4 km	1.60 m^{3}/s	km 7.4	350 m	165.4 km^{2}	14.6 %
Steina	37.3 km	1.58 m^{3}/s	km 4.0	325 m	86.1 km^{2}	8,3 %
Schlücht	28.9 km	5.13 m^{3}/s	km 1.2	316 m	234.6 km^{2}	21.4 %

== Settlements ==
The following settlements lie on or near the Wutach:

- Feldberg (southern Seebach valley)
- Hinterzarten (northern Seebach valley)
- Titisee-Neustadt
- Lenzkirch (Haslach-Tal), with Kappel (start of the Wutach Gorge)
- Friedenweiler (with Rötenbach at the start of the Rötenbach Gorge)
- Bonndorf im Schwarzwald (south of the Wutach Gorge)
- Löffingen (north of the Wutach Gorge)
- Ewattingen (village of Wutach, south of the Wutach Gorge)
- Mundelfingen (borough of Hüfingen, north of the Wutach Gorge)
- Aselfingen (borough of Blumberg)
- Achdorf (Stadt Blumberg)
- Blumberg (east of the Wutach Gorge), with Achdorf at the knee of the Wutach
- Stühlingen, with Grimmelshofen at the exit of the Wutach river rockfaces
- Hallau (east of the Wutach, in Switzerland)
- Schleitheim (east of the Wutach, in Switzerland)
- Eggingen
- Wutöschingen
- Horheim
- Lauchringen
- Tiengen

== Trails ==
The upper Wutach area (Seebach valley, Titisee, Schluchsee, Hochfirst) is one of the most important hiking areas of the Black Forest and is covered by a dense network of trails. Through the Wutach Gorge run two main trails maintained by the Black Forest Club:

- Southern Freiburg-Bodensee Trail
- Ostweg
- Schluchtensteig

South of the Wutach Gorge, from Grimmelshofen downstream, there are footpaths and cycleways by the side of the river.

== See also ==
- List of rivers of Germany

== Literature ==
- Geographisch-Kartographisches Institut Meyer [publ.]: Meyers Naturführer – Südschwarzwald Mannheim, 1989. ISBN 3-411-02775-4.
- Otto F. Geyer et al.: Die Hochrhein-Regionen zwischen Bodensee und Basel = Sammlung Geologischer Führer, 94, Berlin, 2003, ISBN 3-443-15077-2.
- Dieter Kohlhepp: Die Wutachschlucht – Bild einer Urlandschaft. 3rd edn. Rombach Verlag, Freiburg, 1991, ISBN 3-7930-0481-3.
- Landesanstalt für Umweltschutz [Hrsg.]: Die Wutach – Naturkundliche Monographie einer Flusslandschaft = Natur- u. Landsch.-Schutzgeb. Baden-Württ., Vol. 6, Karlsruhe, 1988 ISBN 3-88251-135-4.
- Otti Wilmanns: Exkursionsführer Schwarzwald – eine Einführung in Landschaft und Vegetation Stuttgart, 2001 ISBN 3-8252-2180-6.

Note: Several digital maps erroneously show the course of the Wutach following the former route of the Feldbergdonau, probably as a result of misinterpretation the drainage ditch which links the Schleifebach (Wutach-Nebenbach) and the Aitrach (Danube tributary) and thus forms a pseudo-bifurcation.
