= Blumberg =

- Town
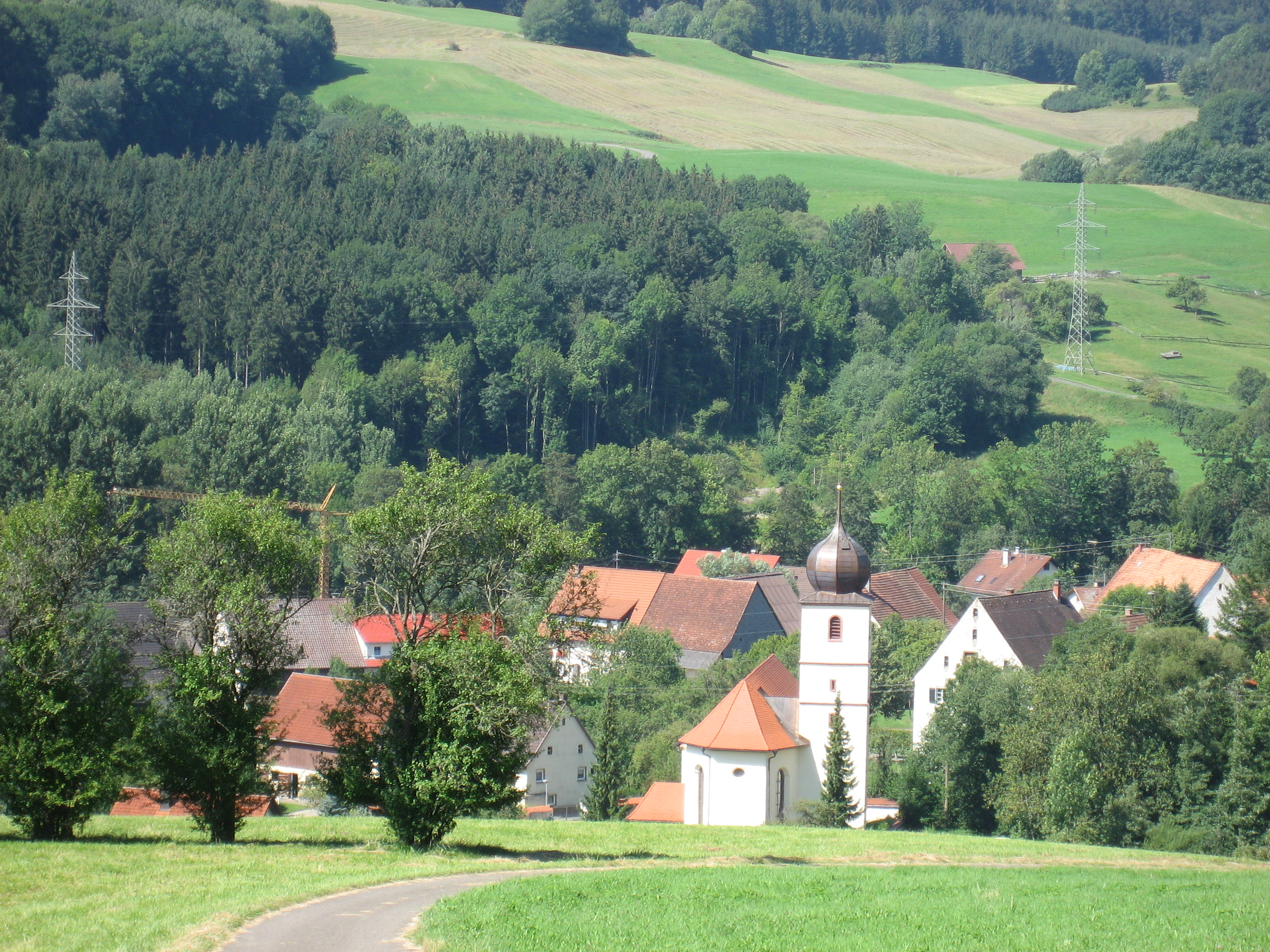
- View over Achdorf

- Coat of arms

- Location of Blumberg within Schwarzwald-Baar-Kreis district
- Interactive map of Blumberg
- Location within Germany Location within Baden-Württemberg
- Coordinates: 47°50′21″N 08°32′03″E
- Country: Germany
- State: Baden-Württemberg
- Admin. region: Freiburg
- District: Schwarzwald-Baar-Kreis
- Subdivisions: 10 Ortsteile

Government
  - Mayor (2017–25): Markus Keller

Area
  - Total: 98.72 km^{2} (38.12 sq mi)
- Elevation: 704 m (2,310 ft)

Population (2025-12-31)
  - Total: 9,847
  - Density: 99.75/km^{2} (258.3/sq mi)
- Time zone: UTC+01:00 (CET)
  - Summer (DST): UTC+02:00 (CEST)
- Postal codes: 78176
- Dialling codes: 07702, 07736
- Vehicle registration: VS
- Website: www.stadt-blumberg.de

Blumberg (German pronunciation: [ˈbluːmbɛʁk]) is a municipality situated in the Schwarzwald-Baar region of Baden-Württemberg, Germany. Nineteen kilometers (12 miles) south of Donaueschingen, it lies between the southern edge of the Schwarzwald, the Black Forest, the border with Switzerland's Canton of Schaffhausen, and Lake Constance.

== History ==
The town of Blumberg is in the region where the source of the Danube is situated, the glacial valley between Eichberg and Buchberg. The town's official origins date from the 13th century, with the Masters of Blumberg first mentioned in 1260. However, one of the oldest settlements, the Steppacher Hof, was already documented in the 12th century, and the town itself is believed to have originated long before that time, as archaeological finds have shown the area was inhabited during the Stone Age.

The Wutach is a 90-kilometer (56 mi) tributary of the Rhine that changes name twice as it passes through the southern Black Forest. Blumberg was established in the Wutach valley near the Wutach Gorge.

Built above the town in the Middle Ages, Blumberg Castle contributed significantly to the development of the surrounding settlements, and while ruled by the princely Fuerstenberg family, who owned a brewery from 1283 until 2004. Blumberg was elevated from a town (Städtle) to a city in 1559.

During the Thirty Years' War from 1618 to 1648, the castle was destroyed. Thanks to its Doggererz iron ore reserves, the town experienced a short-lived expansion after the war's end.

The Doggererz mine was reopened, and the ore was extracted once again from 1934 to 1942 under Nazi Germany Many of these workers were forced labourers, as the practice was widespread at the time in Germany and German-occupied Europe. Blumberg has a memorial honoring these workers. As it shed its status as a primarily agricultural town, Blumberg's population increased rapidly, from 700 in 1935 to 7,000 in 1945.

During World War II, Sophie Scholl, one of the founders of the anti-Nazi White Rose group, spent time in Blumberg. In her memory, the Sophie Scholl Kindergarten was opened on February 28, 1992.

When World War II ended in 1945, the town and surrounding region were occupied by French forces as part of South Baden, as the previous states of Baden and Württemberg had been divided into US and French occupation zones under the Allied occupation of Germany.

Blumberg expanded during the 1950s as various industrial works became established in the district and now has around 10,800 inhabitants, while the town is a thriving tourist area.

Nevertheless, Blumberg has retained a small town sense of community and traditional character, with seasonal festivities, customs, street parties, and parades such as those for the Swabian-Alemannic Fastnacht (carnival) continuing to take place.

Small specialized local stores that go back generations still exist, and for a few weeks, multi-colored, decorated, and filled carnival doughnuts can be found at artisanal bakers, where handmade bread, cake and cookie specialties are freshly baked daily. Early in the morning, butchers begin producing the region's traditionally seasoned cold cuts, sausages, and terrines, as well as fresh meat and Silesian specialties.

== Tourism ==
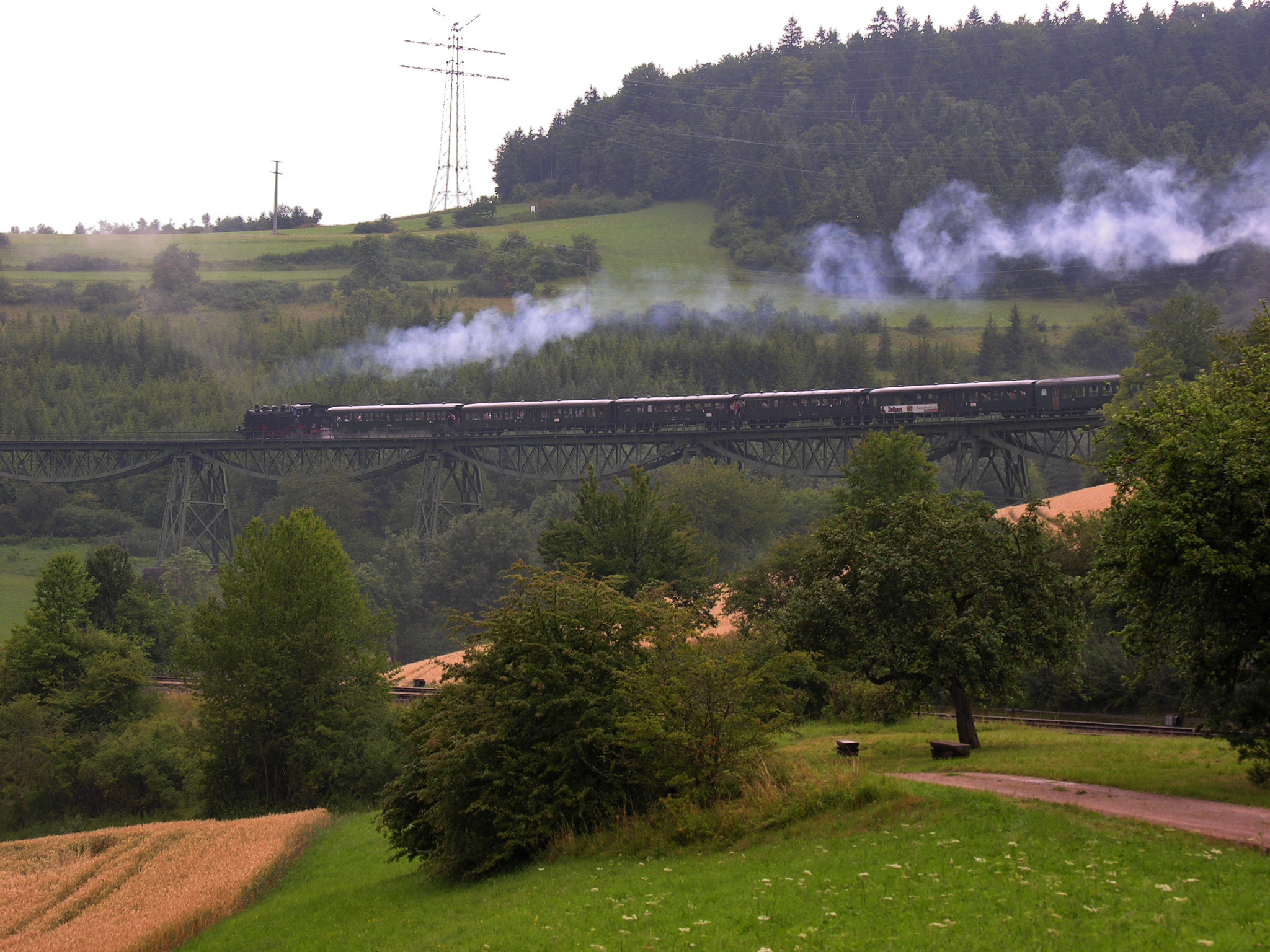
Sauschwänzlebahn, The Wutach Valley Railway

Blumberg is set in the center of one of the most scenic areas of Germany, with everything from castles, nature parks, forests, lakes, and mountains, to skiing, sailing, spas, and tourist-routes, while close by are historic cities.

It is also the starting-point for the Wutach Valley Railway, known as the Sauschwänzlebahn ('Sow-"taily" Line'). It is an old-fashioned steam locomotive with original carriages, running on a railway line that curves and loops around Blumberg like a curled pigtail. It is run as a railway museum and travels on elevated tracks across the countryside throughout the summer months. Service was disrupted from November 2013 to March 2014 due to endangered Barbastella bats quartering in the railway's tunnels.

== Geography ==
=== Districts ===
The municipality of Blumberg is made up of the districts of Blumberg Achdorf, Blumberg, Epfenhofen, Fützen, Hondingen, Kommingen, Nordhalden, Riedböhringen and Riedöschingen, and with the exception of Blumberg itself, each of these has its own district council, which is the custom in Baden-Württemberg.

The village of Achdorf is the only one remaining of the original settlements alongside the river Wutach.

== Religion ==
Even after the Reformation, the Blumberg region remained predominantly Roman Catholic, and produced a cardinal, Curial cardinal Augustin Bea. A museum exists in the house where he was born.

Today the area has four Roman Catholic parishes, two parishes of the Old Catholic Church that follows Ultrajectine theology, as well as a Protestant church, and a New Apostolic church.

== Twin cities ==
- Valdoie, Franche-Comté, northeastern France.
- Kunszentmiklós, Bács-Kiskun County, southern Hungary.

== Personalities ==
- Augustin Bea (1881–1968), Roman Catholic cardinal
- Dieter Koulmann (1939–1979), soccer-player
- Sophie Scholl (1921–1943), figure of German resistance to Nazism
