= Rötenbach (Friedenweiler) =

- Ortsteil of Friedenweiler
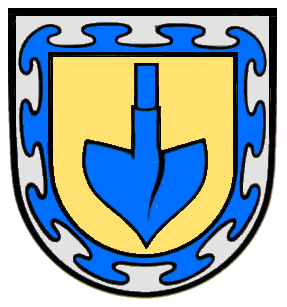
- Coat of arms
- Interactive map of Rötenbach
- Location within Germany Location within Baden-Württemberg
- Coordinates: 47°53′38″N 8°17′36″E
- Country: Germany
- State: Baden-Württemberg
- Municipality: Friedenweiler
- Elevation: 780–950 m (2,560–3,120 ft)

Population
  - Total: 1,400
- Time zone: UTC+01:00 (CET)
  - Summer (DST): UTC+02:00 (CEST)

Rötenbach is a formerly independent village in the Black Forest that has belonged to the municipality of Friedenweiler since 1 January 1975. About 1,400 of the 2,100 inhabitants of Friedenweiler live in Rötenbach.

== Geography ==
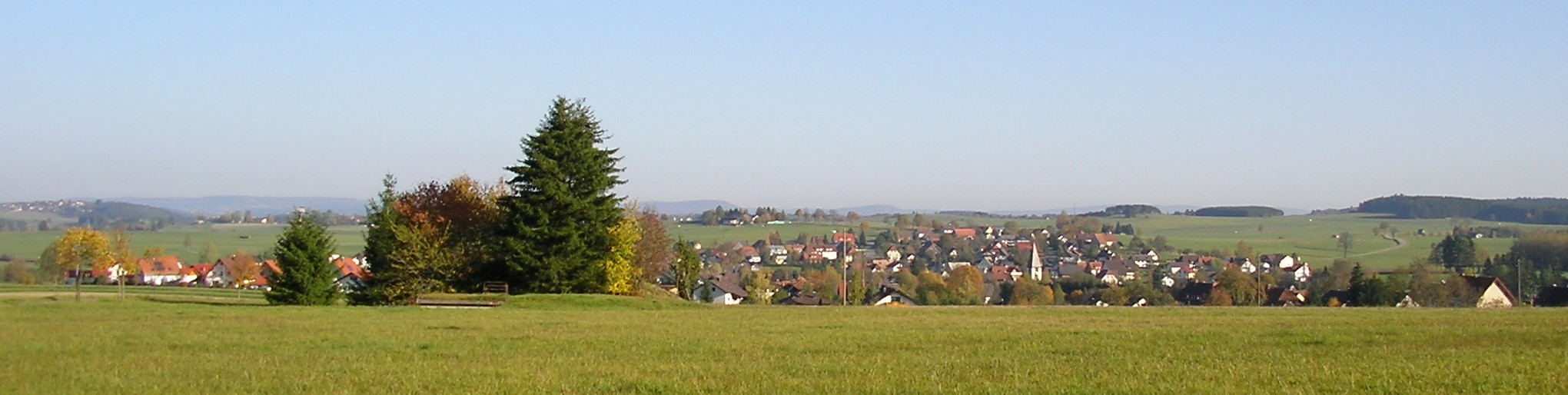
Rötenbach (2004)

Rötenbach lies about 7 km east of Titisee-Neustadt in the southeast of the Black Forest where it transitions to the Baar, at a height of 780 to 950 metres above sea level.

The Rötenbach flows through the village from north to south and continues through the Rötenbach Gorge (Rötenbachschlucht) before emptying into the Wutach.

== History ==
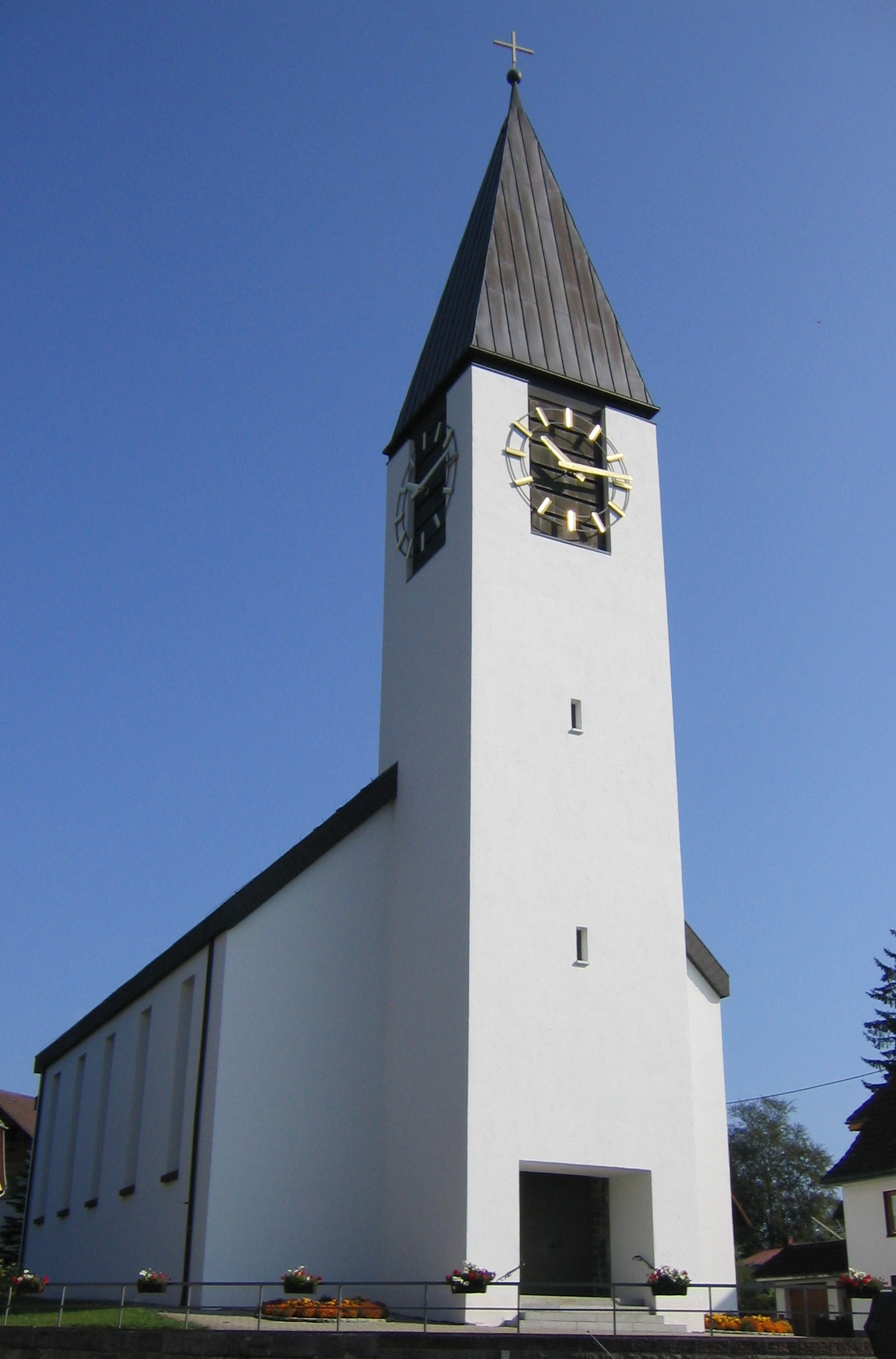
The church in Rötenbach

The village was first mentioned under the name of Rotinbah on 19 January 819. The deed was preserved in St. Gallen. A local nobleman called Ruadger gave a gift to St Martin's Church in Löffingen.

Since 1563 the parish was in the sole ownership of the House of Fürstenberg. Previously there is evidence of ownership by the following ecclesiastical bodies:

- The church in Löffingen
- Friedenweiler Abbey
- Maria Abbey, Neudingen
- Freiburg Charterhouse
- St. Blaise Abbey

Following the dissolution of the Principality of Fürstenberg, Rötenbach went in 1806 to the Grand Duchy of Baden. In the 18th and 19th centuries, Rötenbach was home to a cottage industry, mainly involved in the following activities:

From 1770, clock and watchmaking expanded. For example, since 1782 Rötenbach families ran a clock business in London. In Rötenbach clockface painting (Uhrenschildermalerei) developed into verre églomisé (Hinterglasmalerei). The Winterhalder family of artists was particularly famous for this, especially Benedikt Winterhalder, who was born on 20 March 1813.

Luthiers worked in Rötenbach, presumably coming to the Black Forest from the Tyrol and Italy. Famous Rötenbacher violin makers were Franz Straub and Josef Bier.

== Economy and infrastructure ==
=== Transport ===
The Höllental Railway (from Freiburg via Titisee to Donaueschingen) runs through the village. The section from Neustadt to Donaueschingen was built from 1898 to 1901. In the vicinity is the B 31 federal highway from Freiburg to Lindau.

== Culture and sights ==
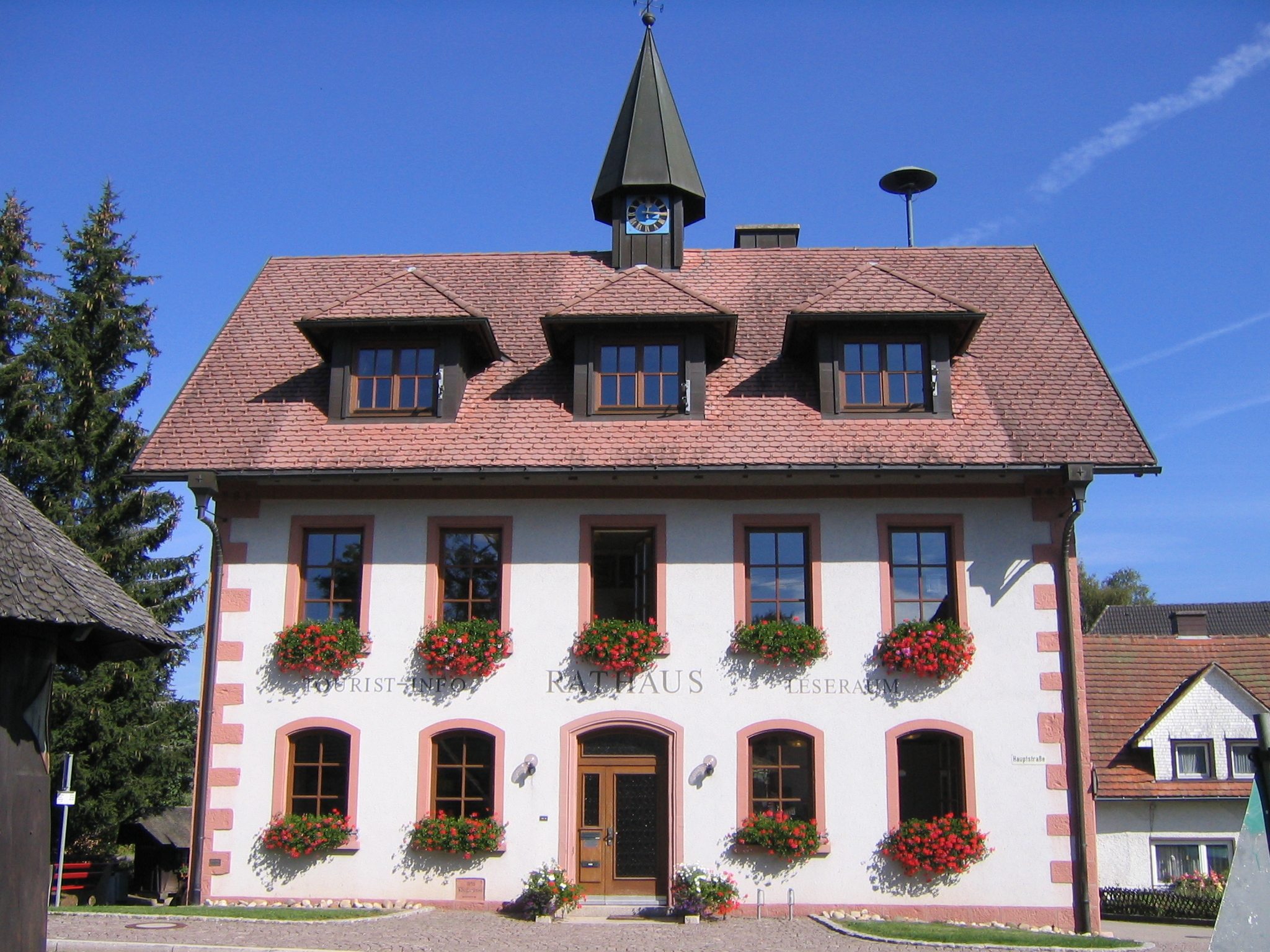
Rathaus

=== Structures ===
The village hall (Rathaus) was built in 1867 and serves today as the municipal hall for Friedenweiler.

=== People linked to the village ===
The father of Padre Rupert Mayer from Rötenbach. Padre Rupert Mayer was a priest in Munich who opposed Nazism and was imprisoned as a result. He died shortly after the end of the Second World War and was beatified by Pope John Paul II on 3 May 1987 in Munich.
