= Wutach (municipality) =

- Municipality
- Coat of arms

- Location of Wutach within Waldshut district
- Interactive map of Wutach
- Location within Germany Location within Baden-Württemberg
- Coordinates: 47°50′17″N 08°26′40″E
- Country: Germany
- State: Baden-Württemberg
- Admin. region: Freiburg
- District: Waldshut

Government
  - Mayor (2023–31): Alexander Pfliegensdörfer

Area
  - Total: 30.51 km^{2} (11.78 sq mi)
- Elevation: 730 m (2,400 ft)

Population (2025-12-31)
  - Total: 1,182
  - Density: 38.74/km^{2} (100.3/sq mi)
- Time zone: UTC+01:00 (CET)
  - Summer (DST): UTC+02:00 (CEST)
- Postal codes: 79879
- Dialling codes: 07709
- Vehicle registration: WT
- Website: www.wutach.de

Wutach (German pronunciation: [ˈvuːtax]) is a rural municipality on the northern edge of the district of Waldshut in Baden-Württemberg in Germany. It has a combined administration with the neighbouring town of Bonndorf. There is no settlement as such called Wutach: the municipality includes the villages of Ewattingen (c. 800 inhabitants), Münchingen (c. 300) and Lembach (c. 200). Most of the municipality's facilities (e.g. council offices, and primary school) are in Ewattingen.

Wutach lies to the south of the Wutach Gorge, through which the river Wutach flows.
