= Schlücht =

River in Germany

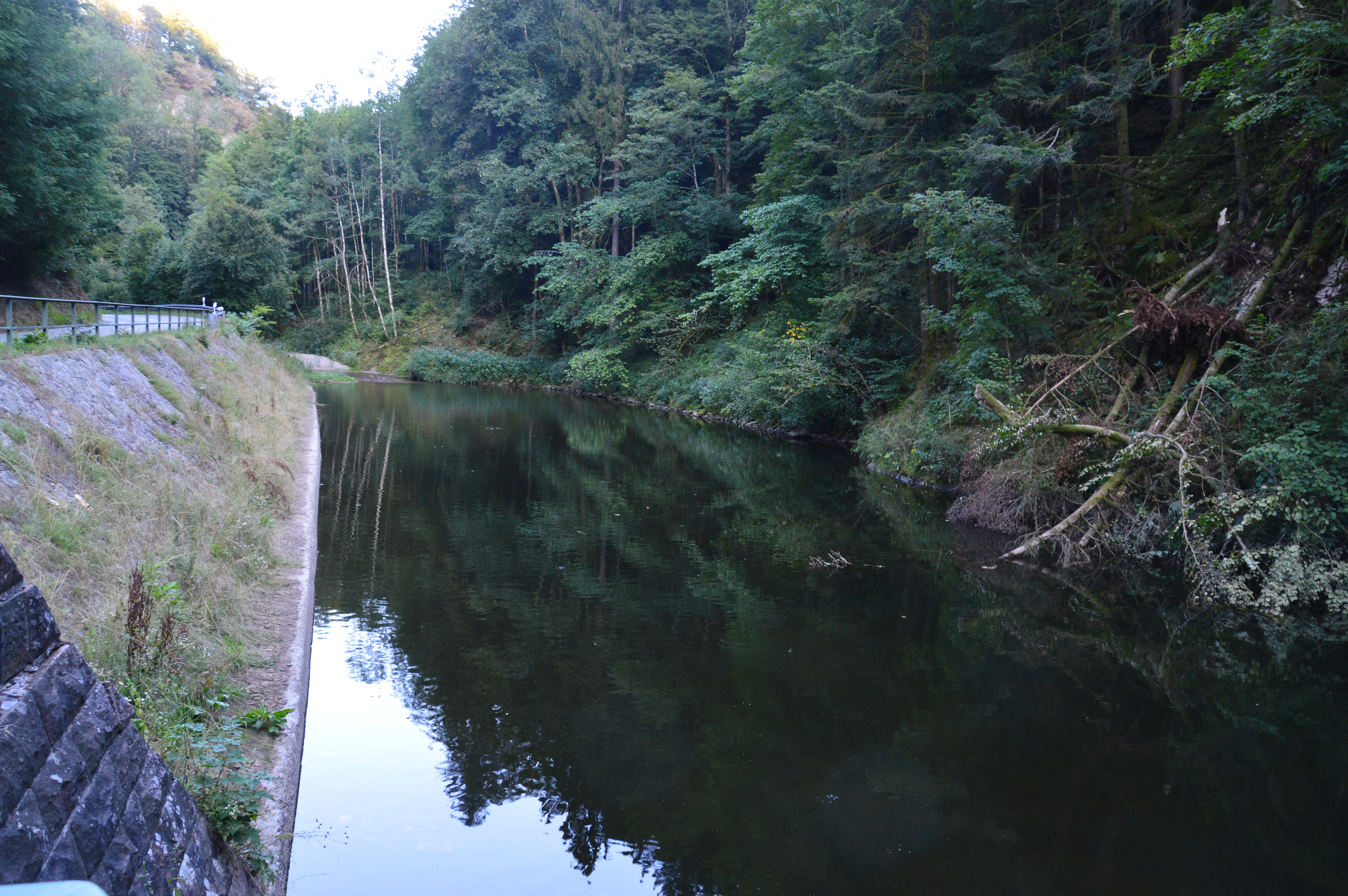

Location
- Country: Germany
- State: Baden-Württemberg

Physical characteristics
- Mouth
  - location: Wutach
  - coordinates: 47.6206°N 8.2607°E
- Length: 28.9 km (18.0 mi)

Basin features
- Progression: Wutach→ Rhine→ North Sea

Schlücht is a river of Baden-Württemberg, Germany. It flows into the Wutach in Waldshut-Tiengen.

== See also ==
- List of rivers of Baden-Württemberg
