= Lauchringen =

- Municipality
- Coat of arms

- Location of Lauchringen within Waldshut district
- Interactive map of Lauchringen
- Location within Germany Location within Baden-Württemberg
- Coordinates: 47°37′50″N 08°18′16″E
- Country: Germany
- State: Baden-Württemberg
- Admin. region: Freiburg
- District: Waldshut

Government
  - Mayor (2018–26): Thomas Schäuble

Area
  - Total: 12.77 km^{2} (4.93 sq mi)
- Elevation: 360 m (1,180 ft)

Population (2025-12-31)
  - Total: 8,057
  - Density: 630.9/km^{2} (1,634/sq mi)
- Time zone: UTC+01:00 (CET)
  - Summer (DST): UTC+02:00 (CEST)
- Postal codes: 79787
- Dialling codes: 07741
- Vehicle registration: WT
- Website: www.lauchringen.de

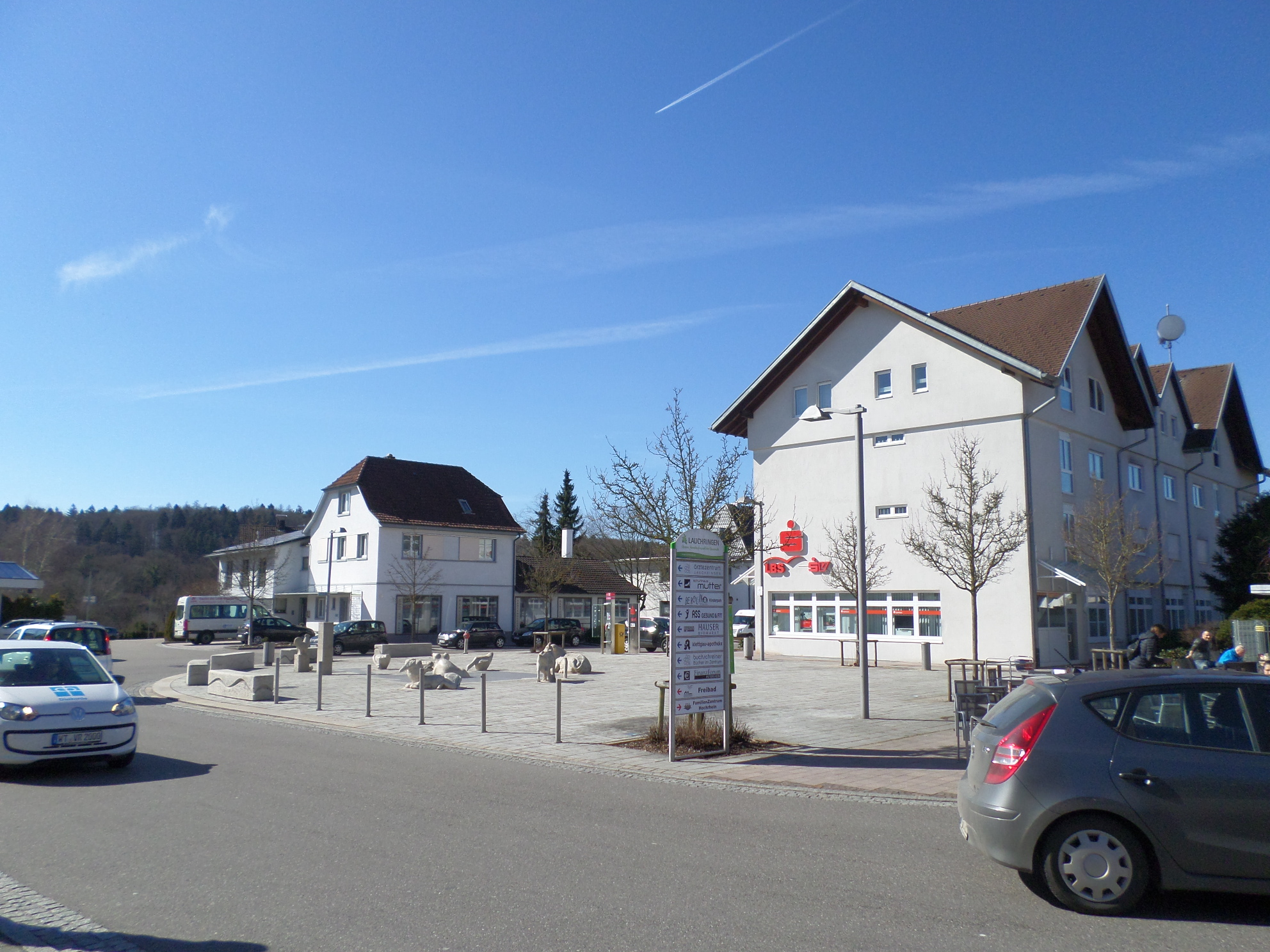
Lauchringen

Lauchringen (German pronunciation: [ˈlaʊxʁɪŋən]) is a municipality in the district of Waldshut in Baden-Württemberg in Germany. It is divided in two districts: Oberlauchringen and Unterlauchringen.

== Geography ==
Lauchringen lies on the Rhine Plain in the lower Klettgau at the foot of the Küssaberg with its castle of Küssaburg, one of the landmarks of the region.

== Demographics ==
Population development:

| Year | Inhabitants |
|---|---|
| 1990 | 6,717 |
| 2001 | 7,328 |
| 2011 | 7,494 |
| 2021 | 7,992 |
