= Windgfällweiher =

Lake in Baden-Württemberg, Germany

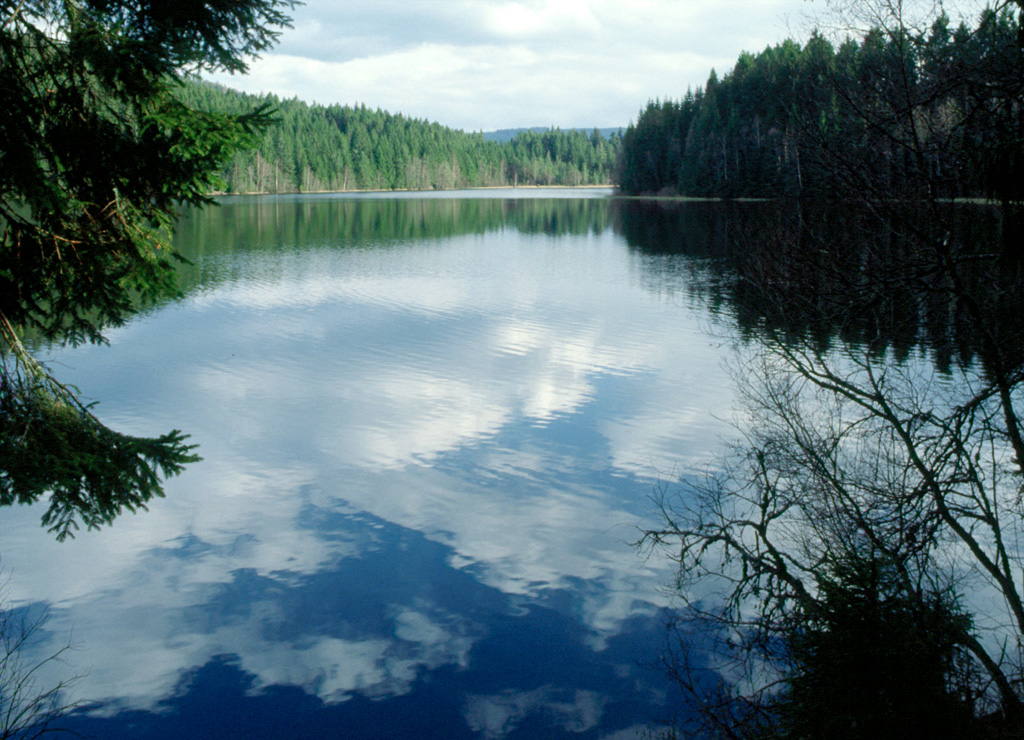
- View of the lake

- Location within Baden-Württemberg
- Location: Southern Black Forest, Baden-Württemberg
- Coordinates: 47°51′07″N 08°07′33″E
- Primary inflows: Kähnerbächle
- Primary outflows: Windgefällbach (channel) to the Schluchsee
- Basin countries: Germany
- Max. length: 0.7 km (0.43 mi)
- Max. width: 0.4 km (0.25 mi)
- Surface area: 19.81 ha (49.0 acres)
- Max. depth: 6 m (20 ft)
- Surface elevation: 966.2 metres (3,170 ft)
- Settlements: Titisee-Neustadt

The Windgfällweiher is a reservoir between the Titisee and the Schluchsee in the south of Baden-Württemberg, Germany. It is located within the High Black Forest and lies in a hollow formed by ice age glaciation between the villages of Altglashütten, Falkau and Aha on the territory of the municipality of Lenzkirch.

The lake lies in a trough that runs from the Seebach valley in the northwest to the Schluchsee in the southeast and thus crosses the generally northeastward-running streams in the area. This remnant of a former valley is followed by the Three Lakes Railway that was built between 1920 and 1926 and by the transfer channel (Überleitungskanal), built in 1932 and belonging to the Schluchseewerk, which takes water from the Seebach valley via the Haslach valley to the Schluchsee Basin.

North of the low-lying watershed in this trough, between the Haslach in the north and the Ahabach in the south, now drowned by the impounded Schluchsee, the glacier of the last ice age carved out a basin, in which a small bog lake formed, the natural precursor to today's reservoir. This was enlarged in 1895 by the former Falkau Screw Works (Schraubenfabrik Falkau) with a dam in the north and the water surface raised by about 6 metres. At the same time the lake, which had only hitherto been fed from the east by the Kähnerbächle, was given another inflow in the form of a small leat (Hangkanal) from the southwest. Since 1932 the Windgfällweiher has been incorporated into the transfer of water from the Seebach to the Schluchsee (covered leat) and drained since then in the opposite direction i.e. to the south. The water is led via a ditch over the low watershed, initially as the Windgefällbach and later, the Schwarzach, into the Schluchsee.

Since 1950 the lake has been protected. In 2002 an angling and fish consumption ban was announced, because PCB had been discovered in the sediment depositions on the bottom of the lake.

On the wooded eastern shore of the Windgfällweiher, a lake barely touched by the streams of visitors to the area, lies a rather less picturesque bathing beach with a listed building.

The Windgfällweiher, together with the Schluchsee and Titisee, contributed to the name of the Three Lakes Railway.

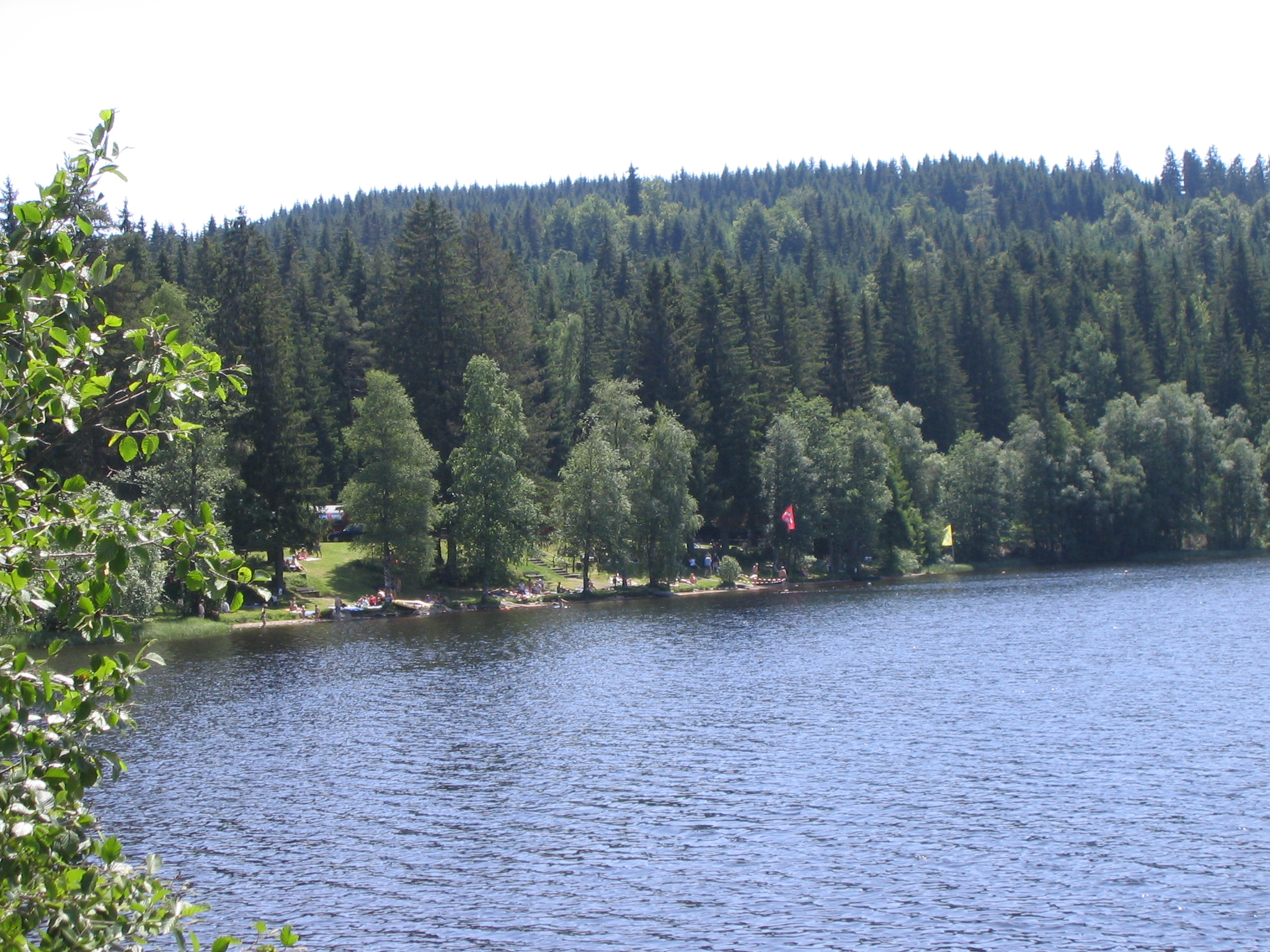
View of the bathing area

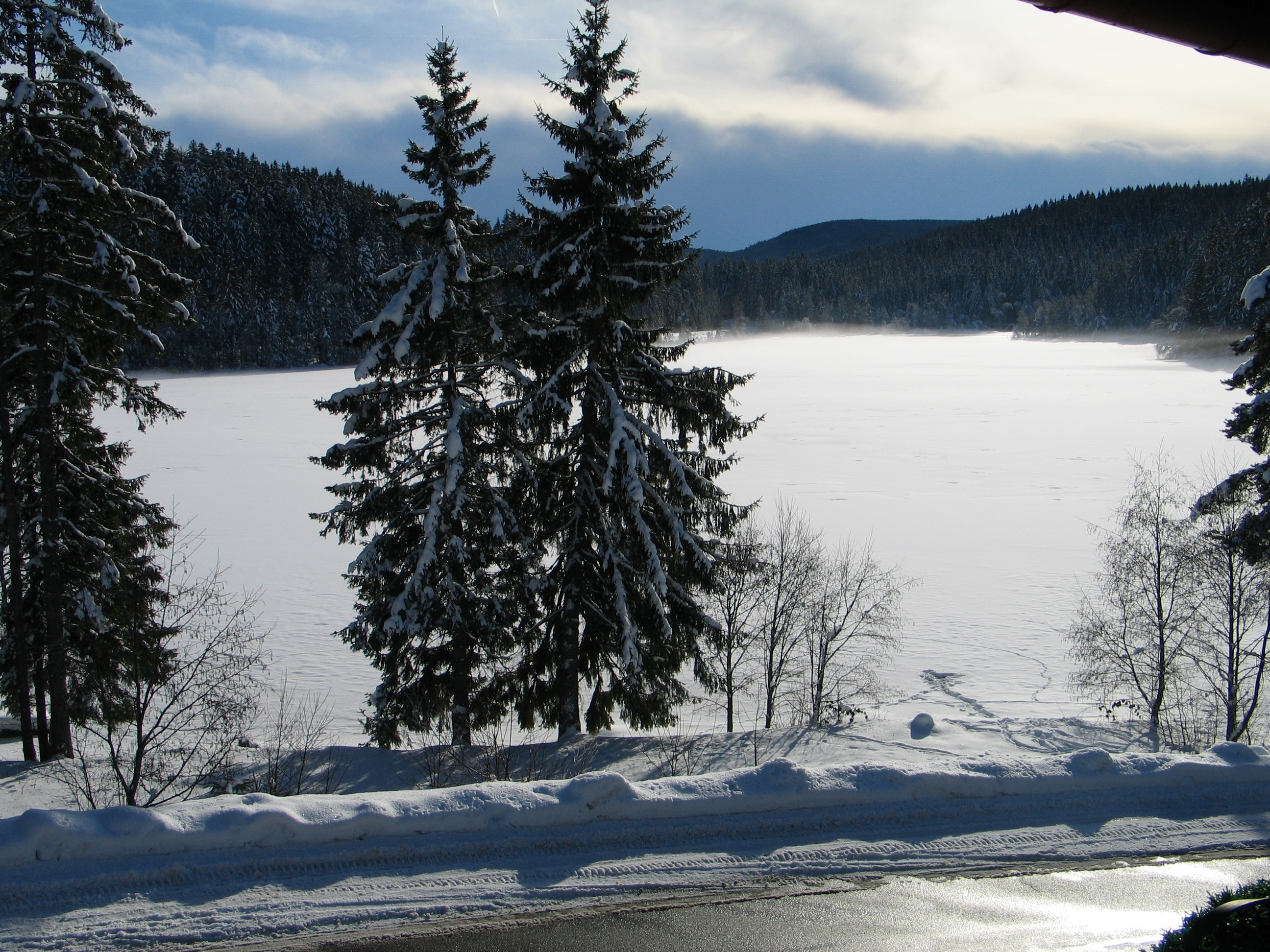
The Windgfällweiher in winter

== See also ==
- List of lakes in Germany
