= Three Lakes Railway =

Railway line in Germany

Three Lakes Railway Dreiseenbahn Titisee–Seebrugg
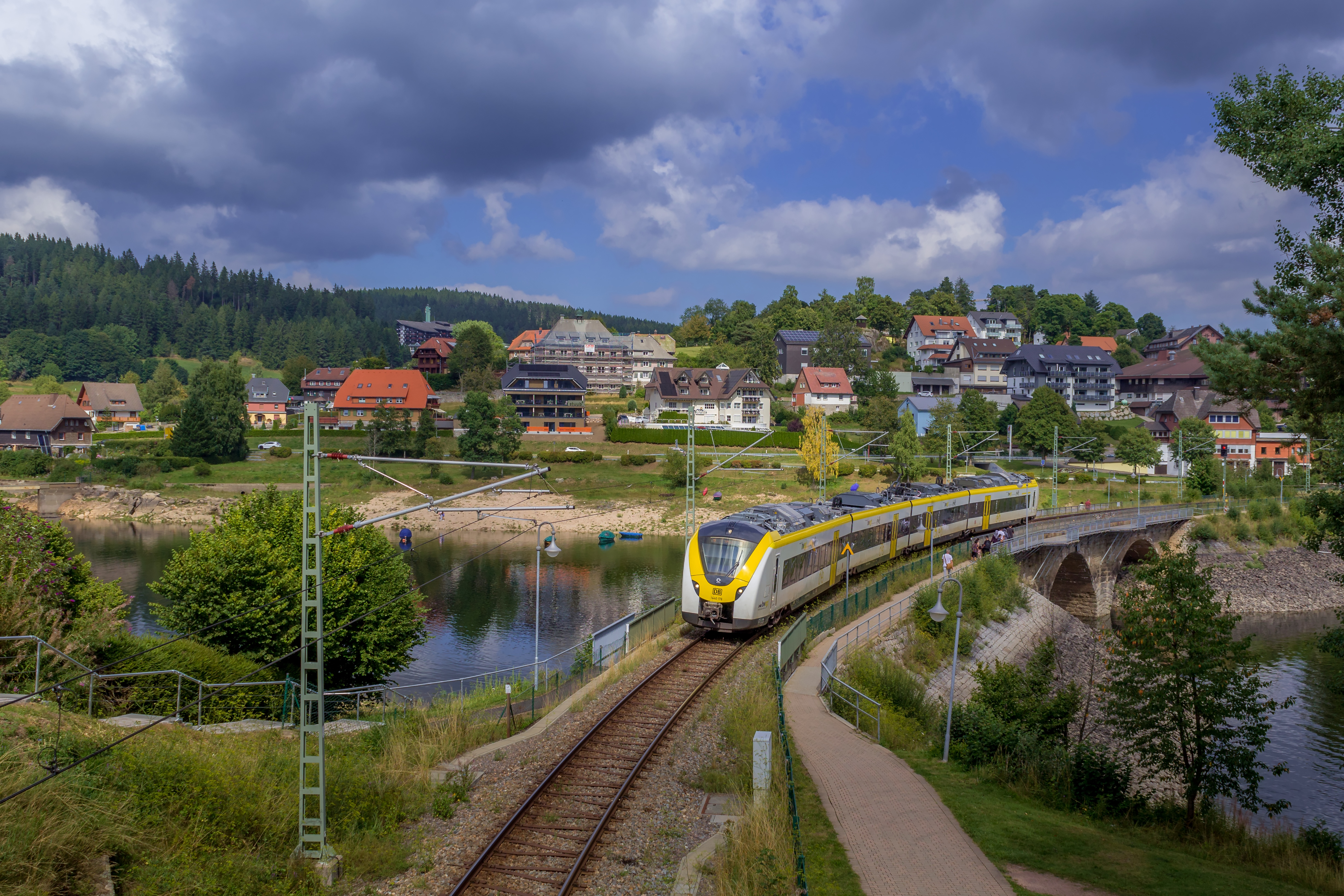
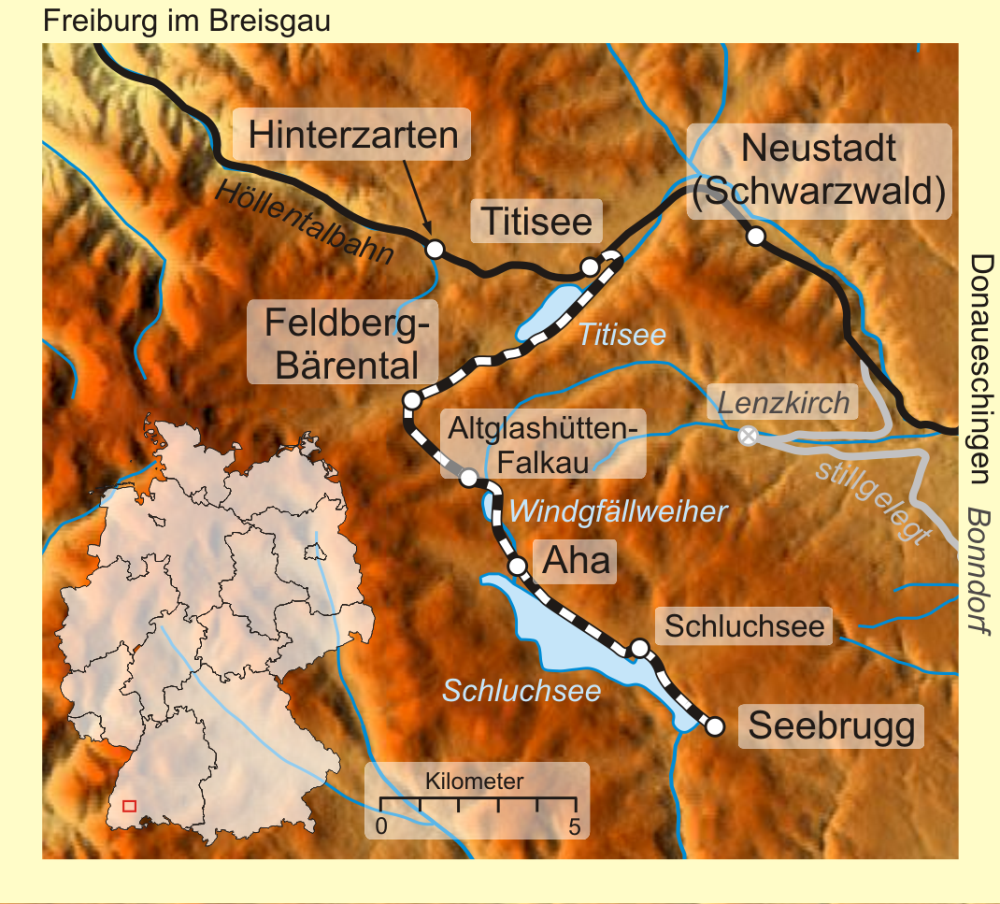
- Alstom Coradia Continental in Schluchsee

Overview
- Line number: 4301

Service
- Route number: 728

Technical
- Line length: 19.2 km (11.9 mi)
- Track gauge: 1,435 mm (4 ft 8 1/2 in)
- Electrification: (to 1960: 20 kV 50 Hz ~); 15 kV, 16 2/3 Hz AC

The Three Lakes Railway (German: Dreiseenbahn, or sometimes, Drei-Seen-Bahn.) is a 19.2 km (11.9 mi) long line in the German state of Baden-Württemberg. The line is electrified to the standard 15 kV, 16 2/3 Hz system commonly used throughout the German railway network.

The Dreiseenbahn branches southwards from the Höllentalbahn railway, from Freiburg im Breisgau to Donaueschingen, at Titisee station. Along its route it serves stations and halts at Feldberg-Bärental, Altglashütten-Falkau, Aha and Schluchsee, before terminating at Seebrugg.

The line is so called because it passes by the three lakes of Titisee, Windgfällweiher and Schluchsee.

On certain dates throughout the year historic steam trains are operated between Seebrugg, Titisee and Löffingen (Höllentalbahn) by IG 3-Seenbahn, an association of railway enthusiasts located in Seebrugg.

== Gallery ==
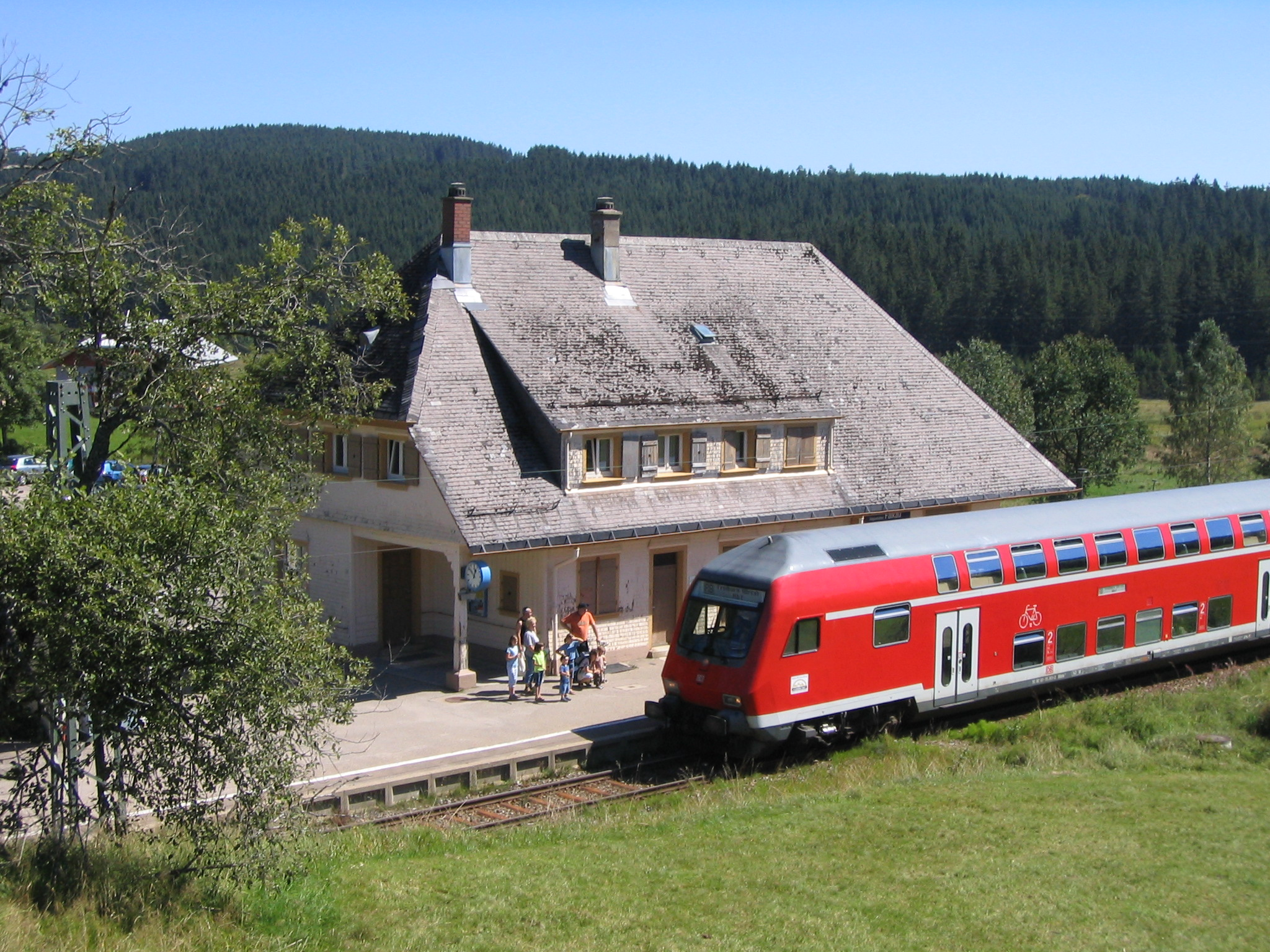
Altglashütten-Falkau halt

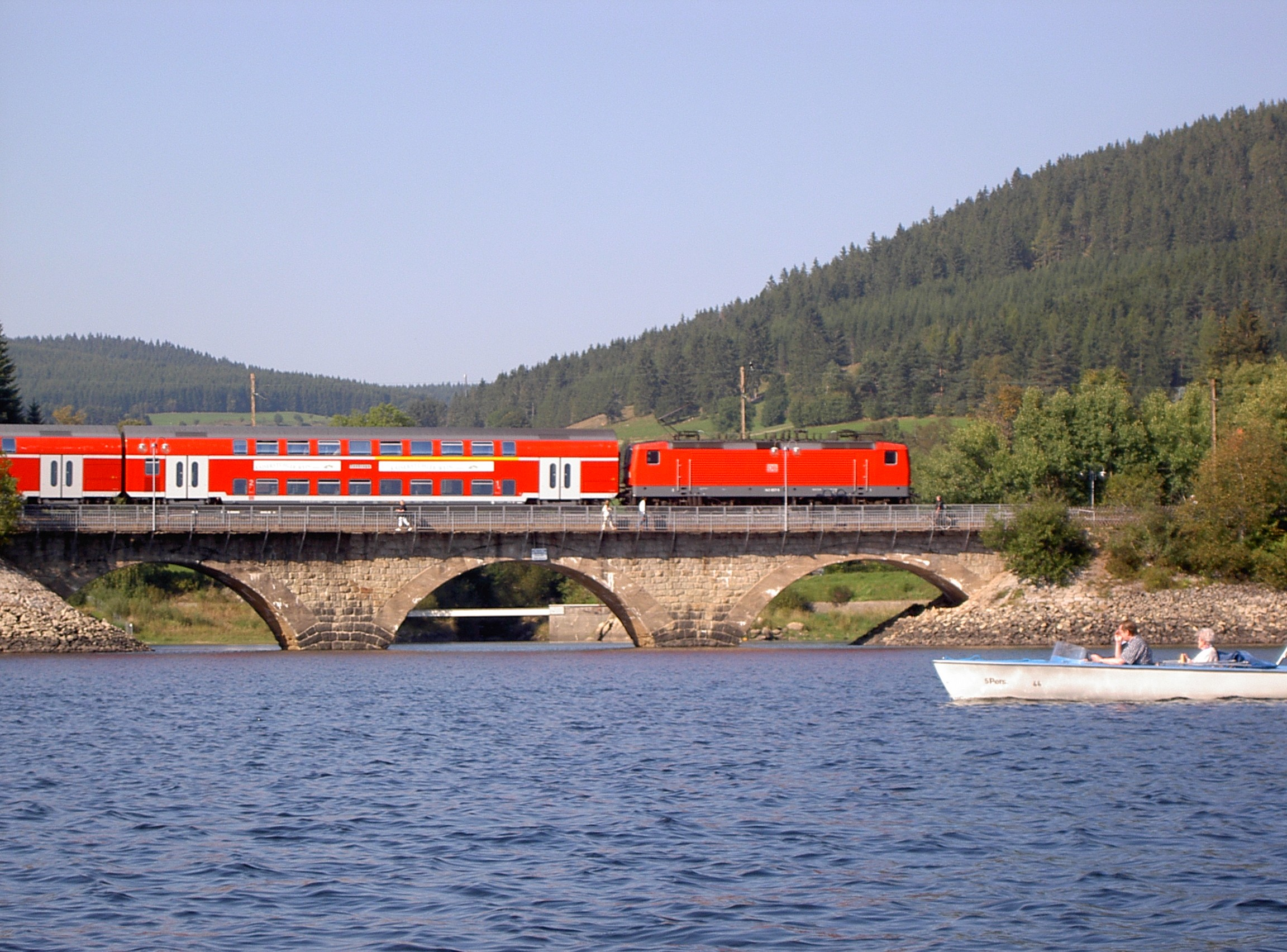
Double-decker train on the Schluchsee Bridge

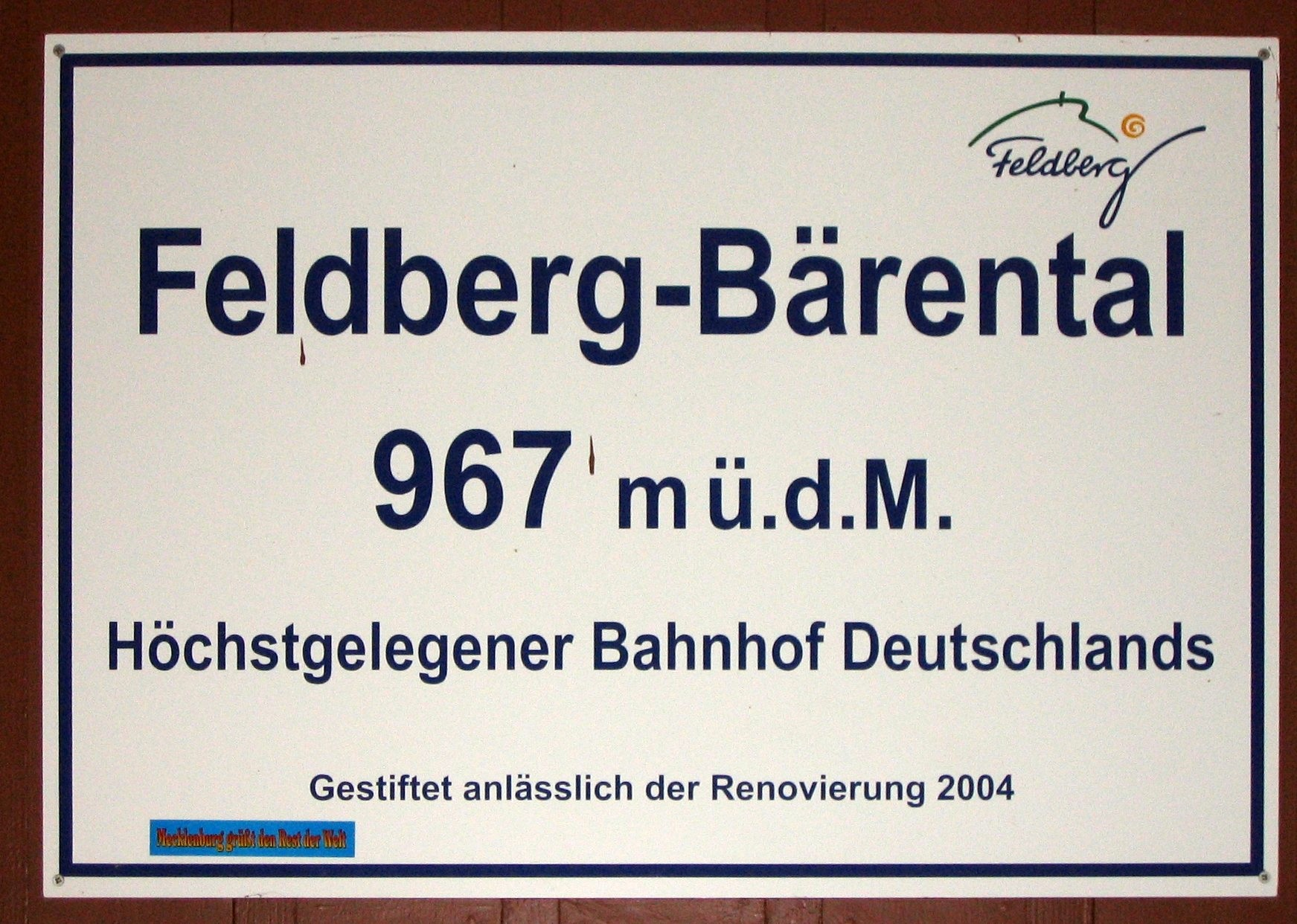
Information board at Feldberg-Bärental station

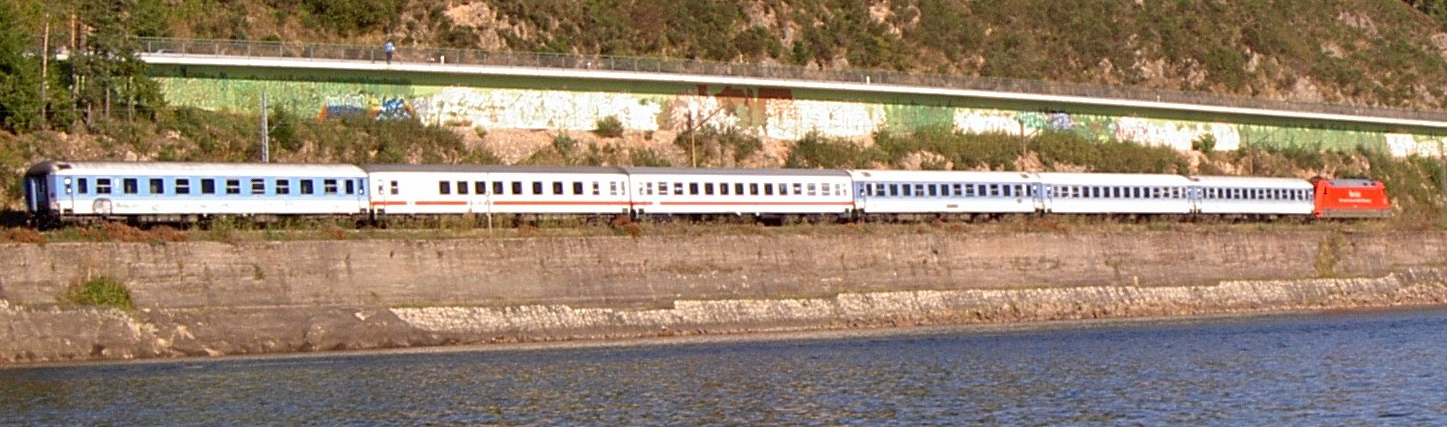
IR Höllental train at Schluchsee

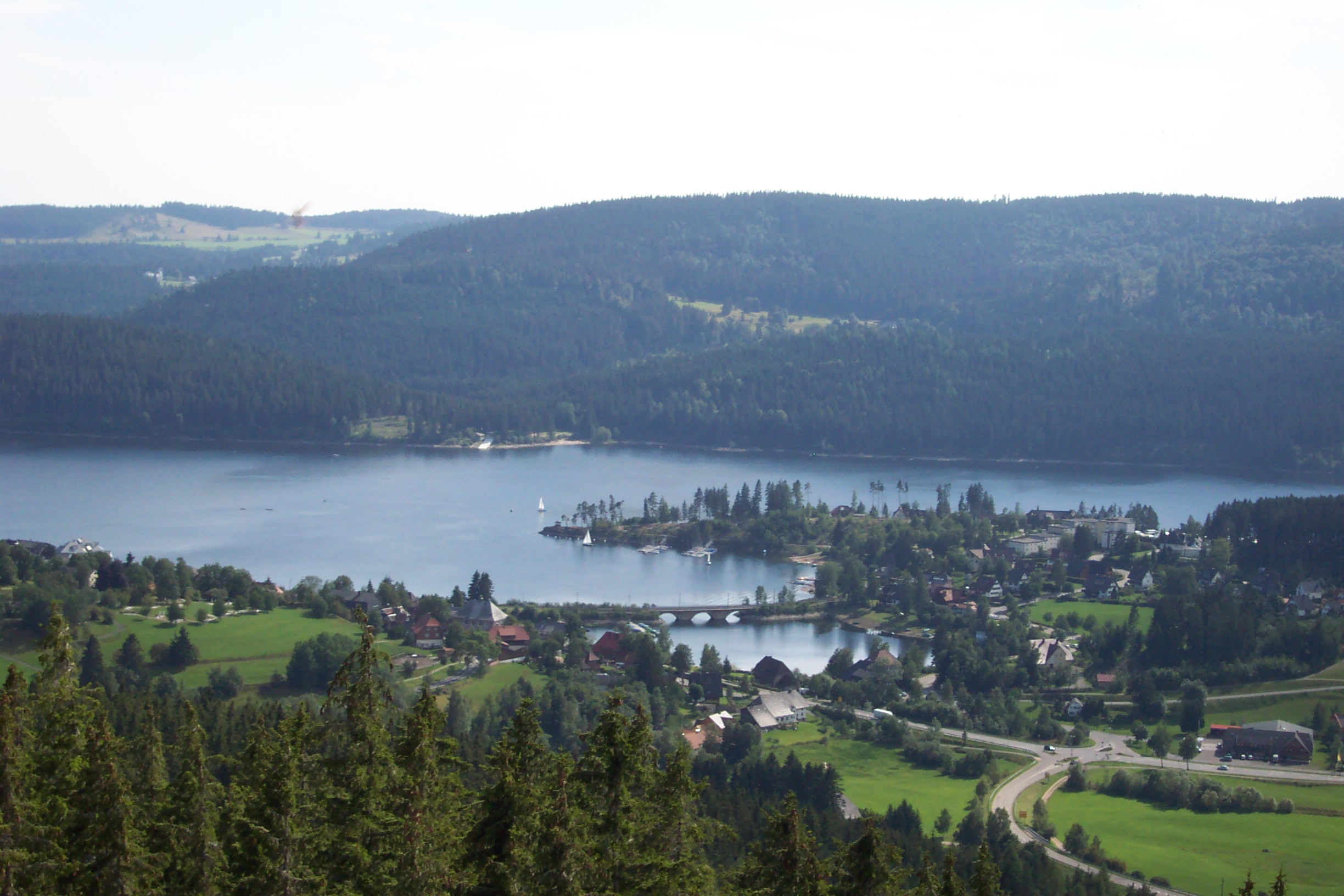
Railway bridges in Schluchsee

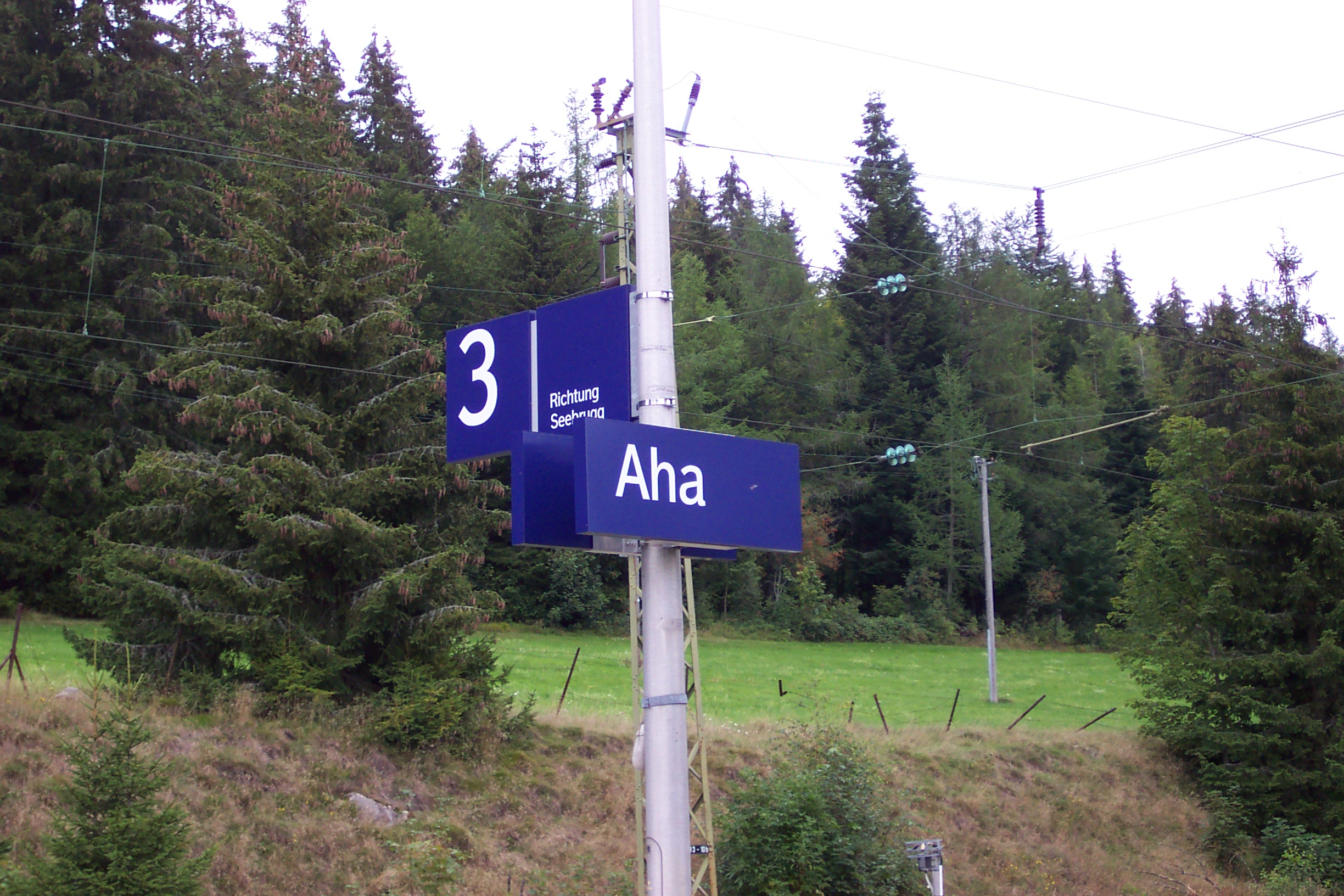
Aha station

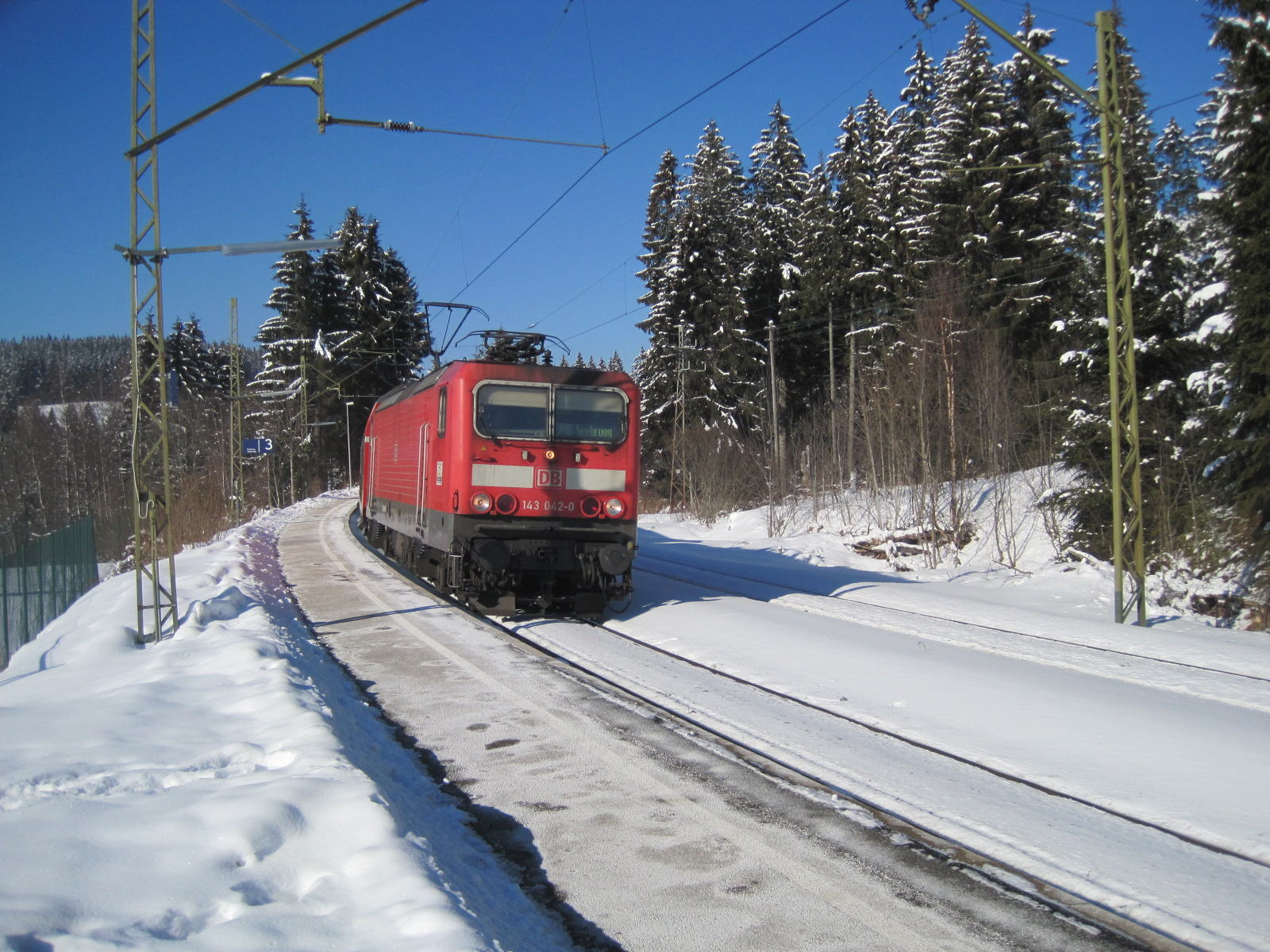
Winter in Aha station

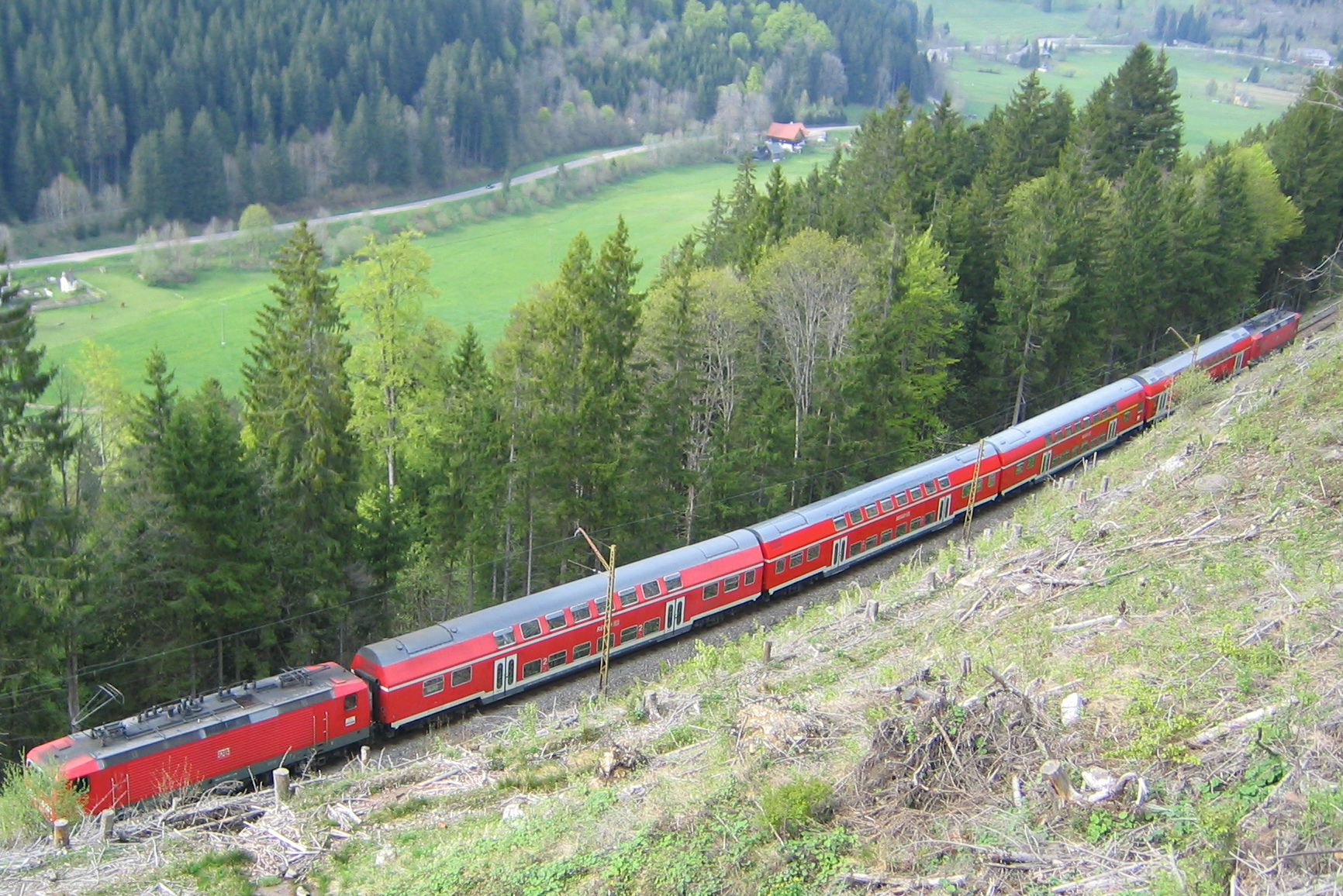
Just before Feldberg-Bärental station

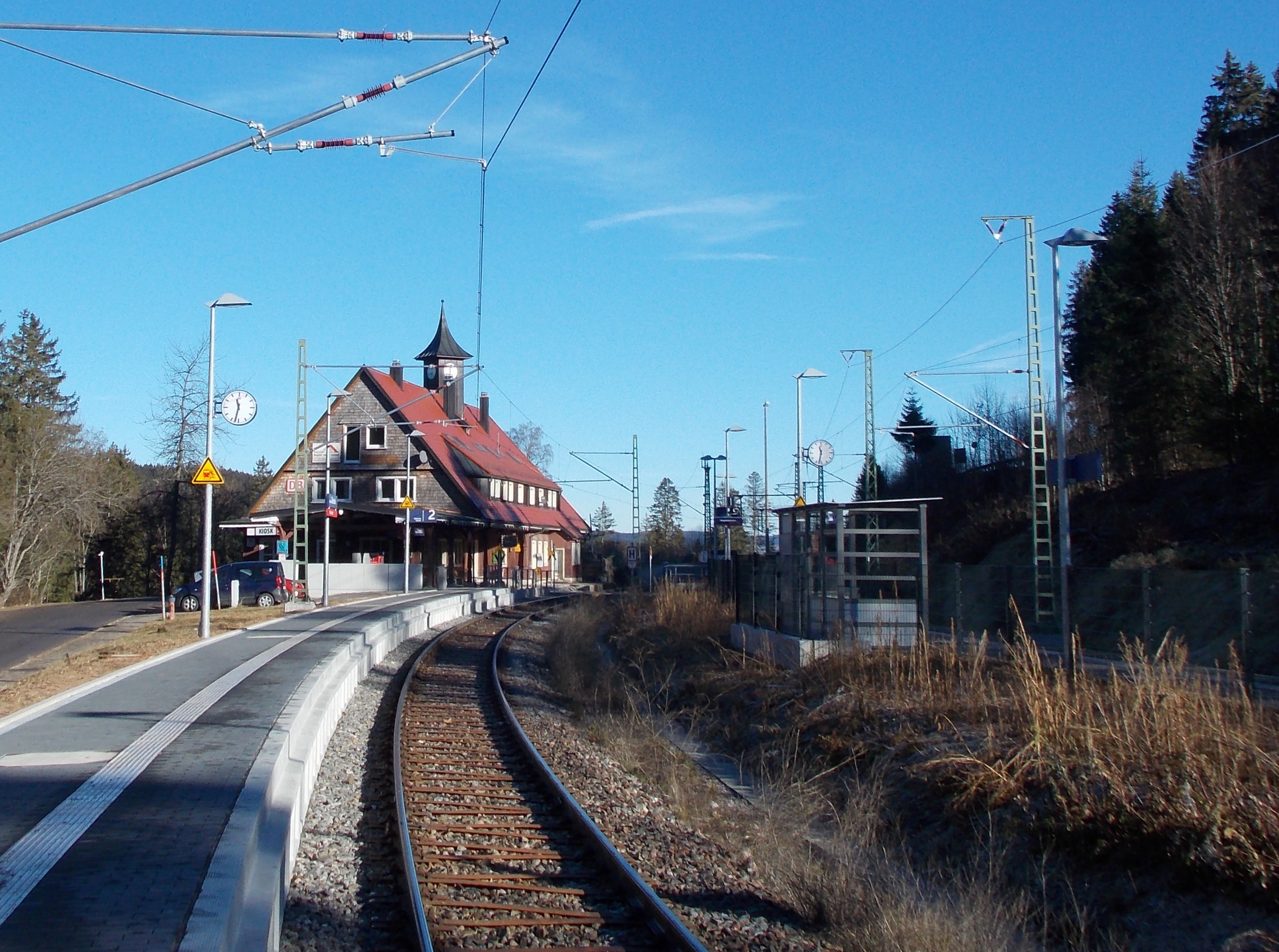
Platform at Feldberg-Bärental station
