= IG 3-Seenbahn =

Coordinates: 47°48′05″N 8°11′46″E

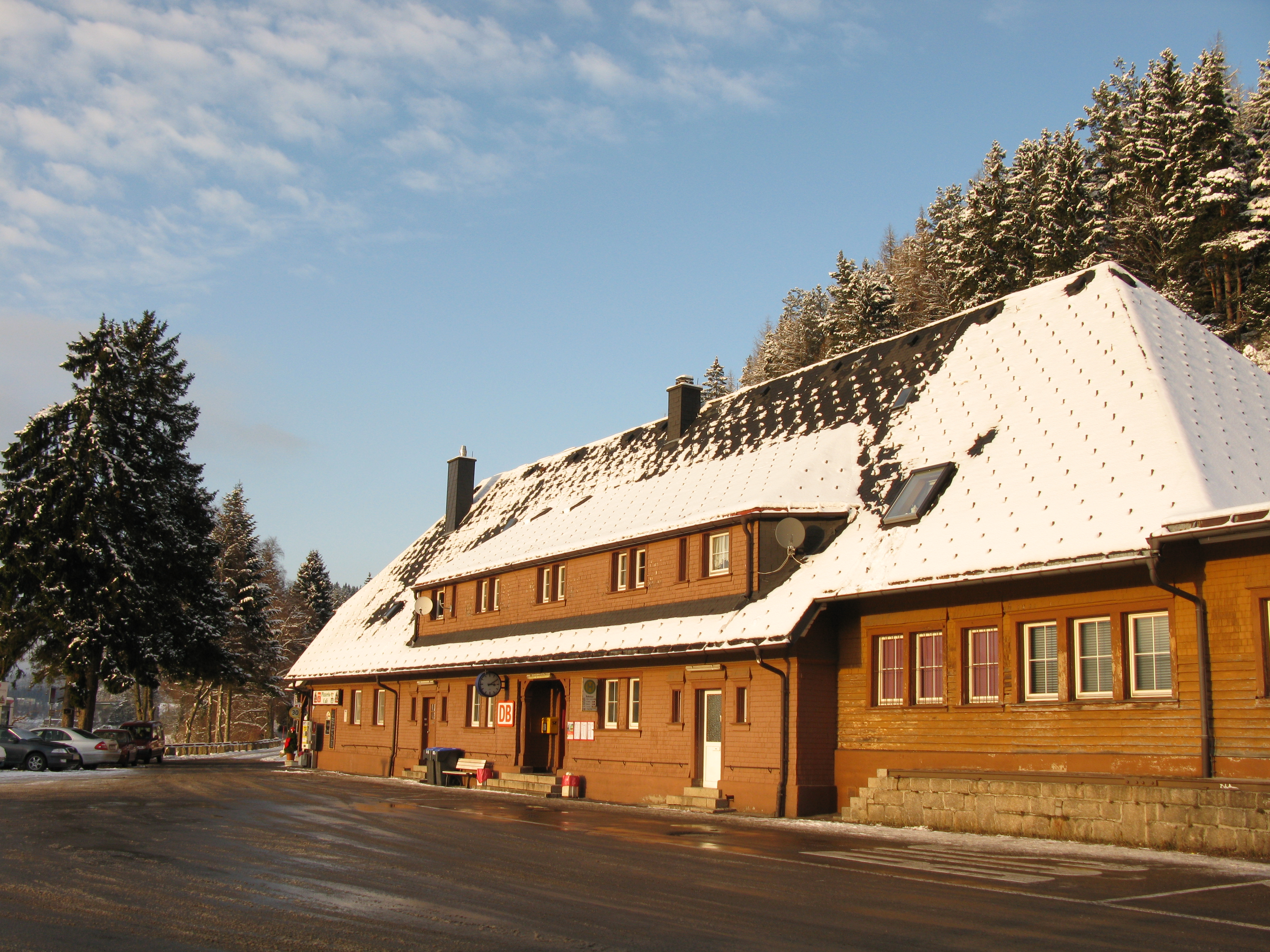
Seebrugg Station building

IG 3-Seenbahn, Baden-Württemberg

The Interessengemeinschaft 3-Seenbahn e.V. is a German heritage railway located in Schluchsee-Seebrugg in Black Forest. It was founded on 13 January 2008 to prevent the demolition of the former freight yard in Seebrugg. At certain dates all over the year the volunteers organize and operate vintage train rides on the Three Lakes Railway (Titisee – Seebrugg) and on the Höllentalbahn (Freiburg – Titisee – Donaueschingen)

== History ==
In 2008, Deutsche Bahn (DB) planned to demolish the abandoned former Seebrugg freight yard. At this time, the station was largely in the state of the 1950s, so eight railway enthusiasts founded a society to save the tracks from being removed. After they managed to stop the demolition and to buy the terrain from DB, they organized first steam train rides in August 2008, which were financed by ten communities near Seebrugg. They started to free the tracks from vegetation. Since 2009, the tracks are passable again. The same year in summer they were first used by steam trains.

In 2010 an original Baden water crane was placed in Seebrugg. In April a Henschel DEL 110, a 1939 Diesel-Electric switcher, was handed over by Club 41 073 as permanent loan. In May an Eilzugwagen reached Seebrugg as their first own rail vehicle.

In 2011 the society started to raise money to renovate the old tracks, which were about 50 years old and in poor condition. The districts of Lörrach, Waldshut and Breisgau-Hochschwarzwald and several communities in Black Forest promised financial support. Additionally, €270,000 were asked from the LEADER funding program of the EU. From 14 September until November 2014 the tracks were completely changed by Geiger + Schüle Bau Ulm. In the following years the overhead wiring will be hung up again after being illegally removed by DB in 2008.

The 3-Seenbahn wants to transform the freight yard Seebrugg into a railway museum in the style of the 1950s. They want the visitors to be able to go on a journey through the post-war years.

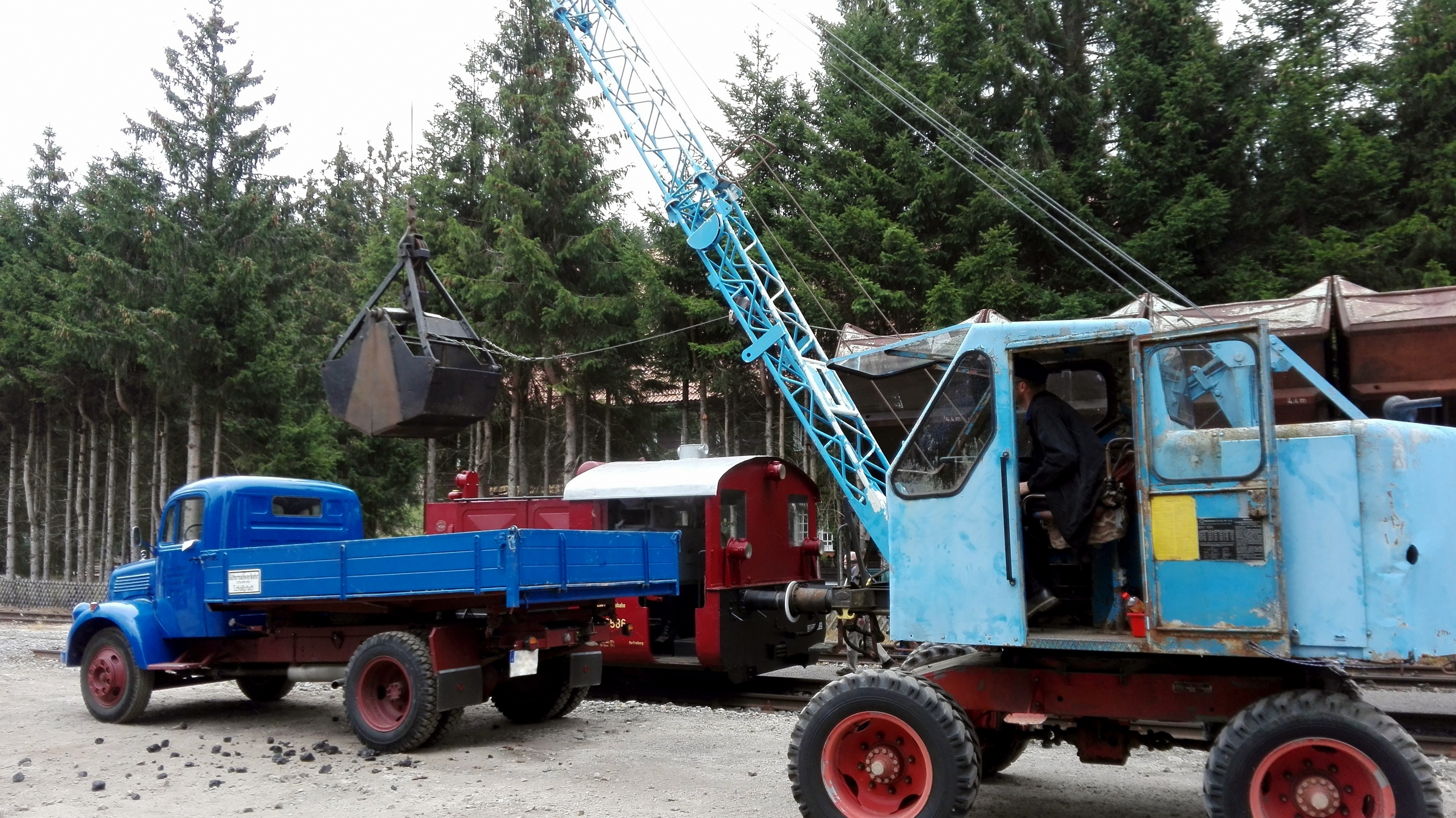
Coal loading demonstration, summerfest 2015

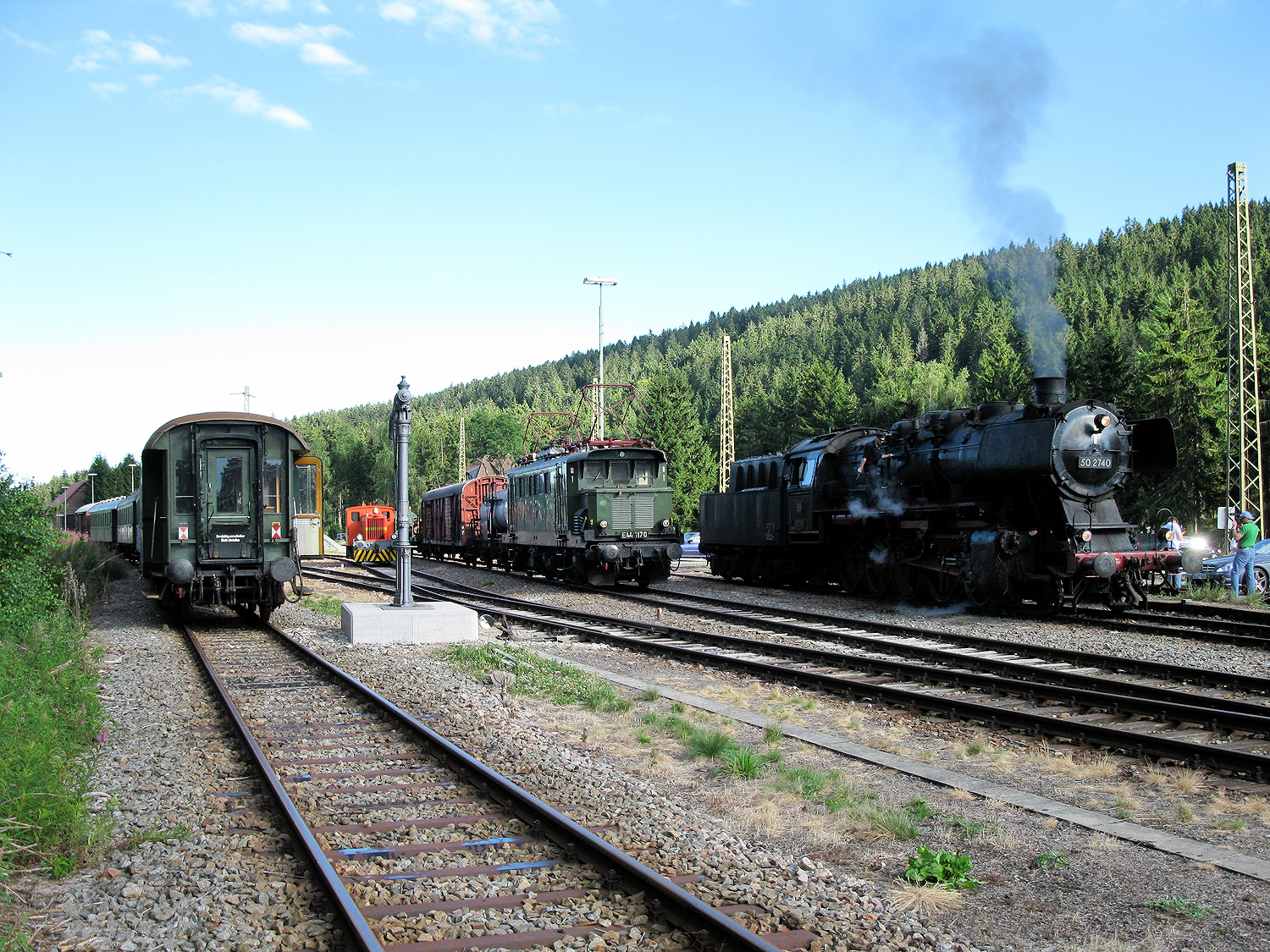
Seebrugg while summerfest 2010

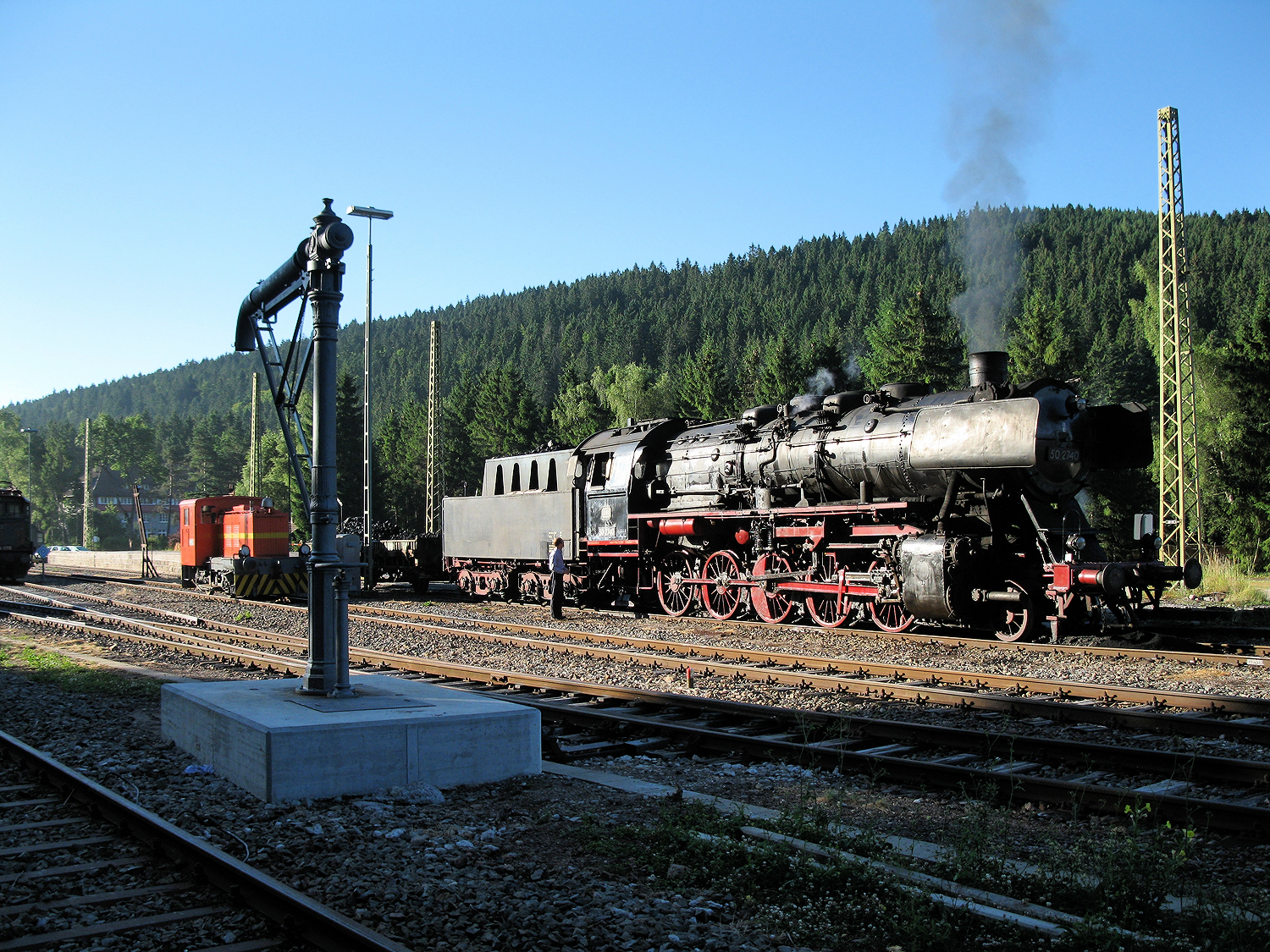
The water crane

== Rolling stock ==
The rolling stock of the IG 3-Seenbahn e.V. consists of locomotives and wagons as they could be found in the Black Forest between 1945 and 1960.

=== Locomotives ===
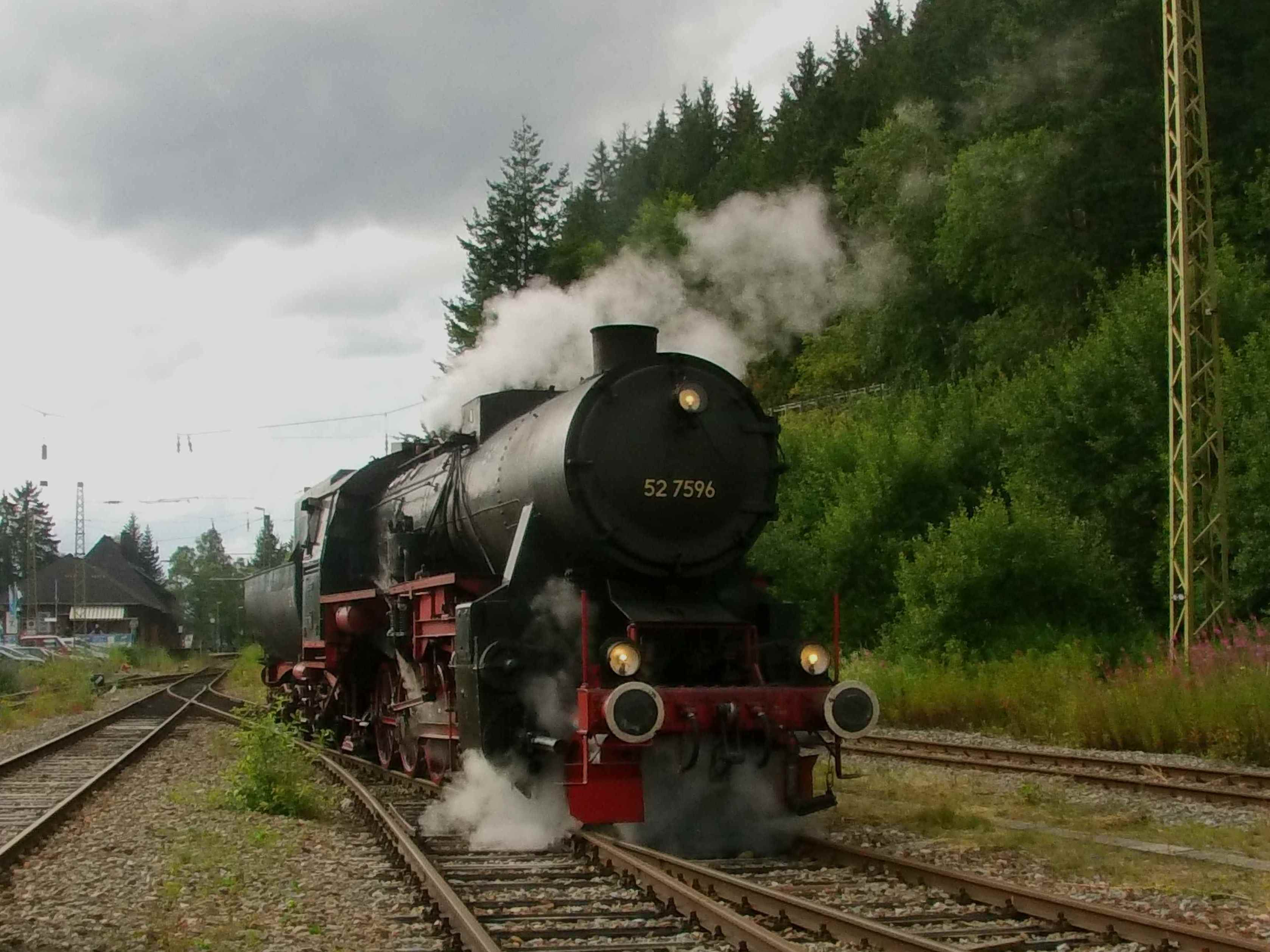
52 7596 in Seebrugg, Sommerdampf 2012

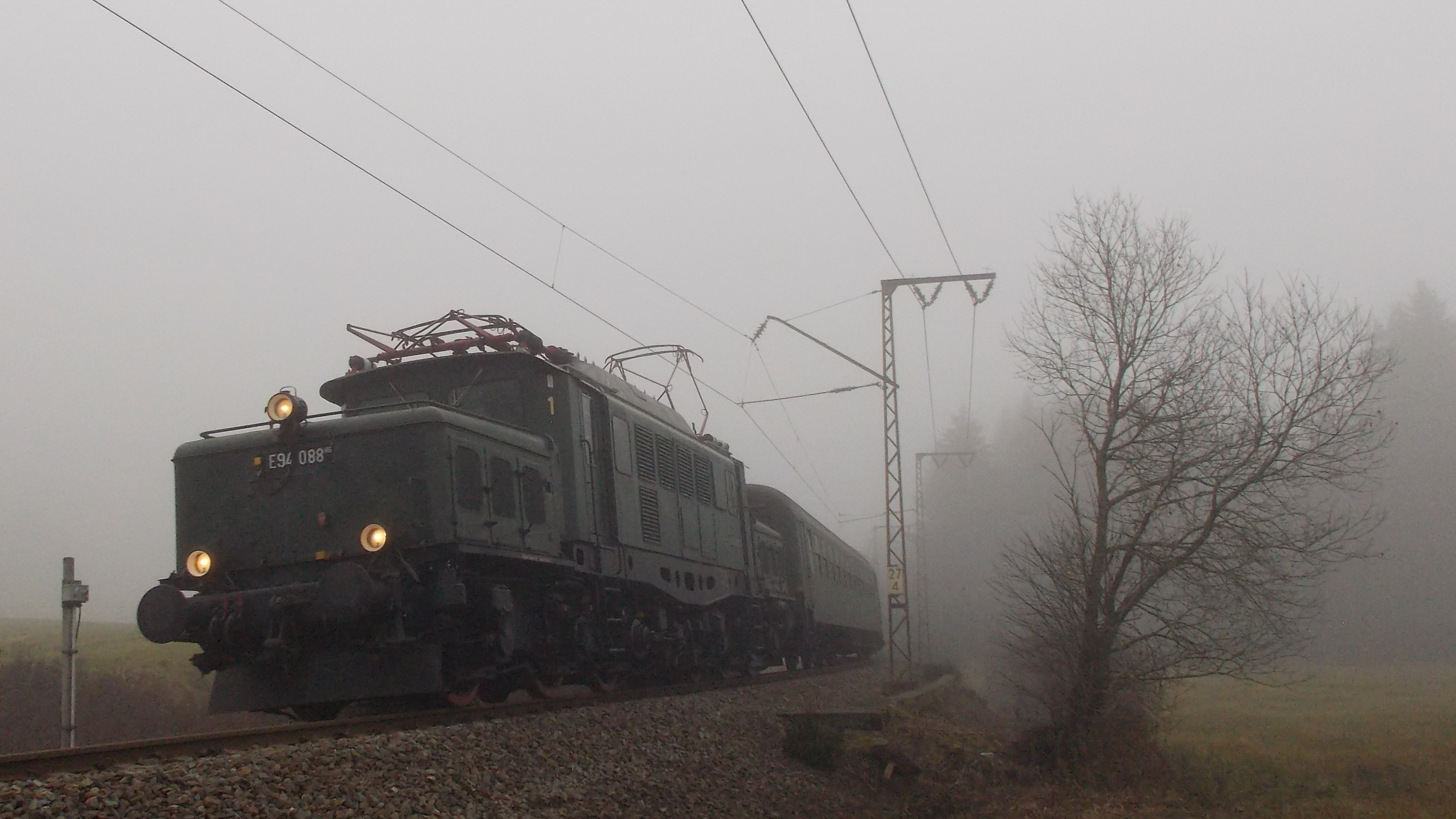
E 94 088 in December 2014 between Hinterzarten and Titisee

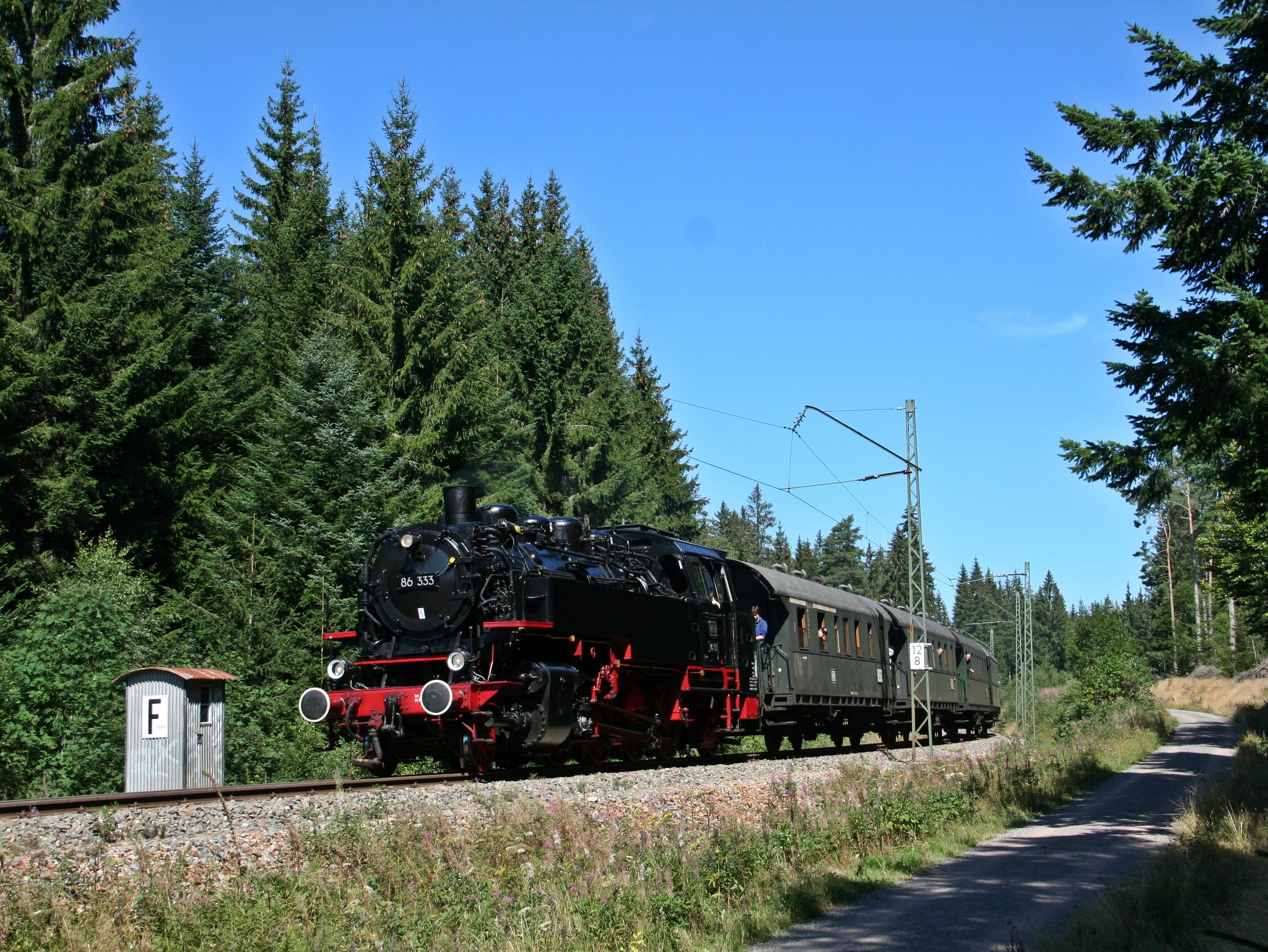
Locomotive 86 333 in Summer 2015 at Aha

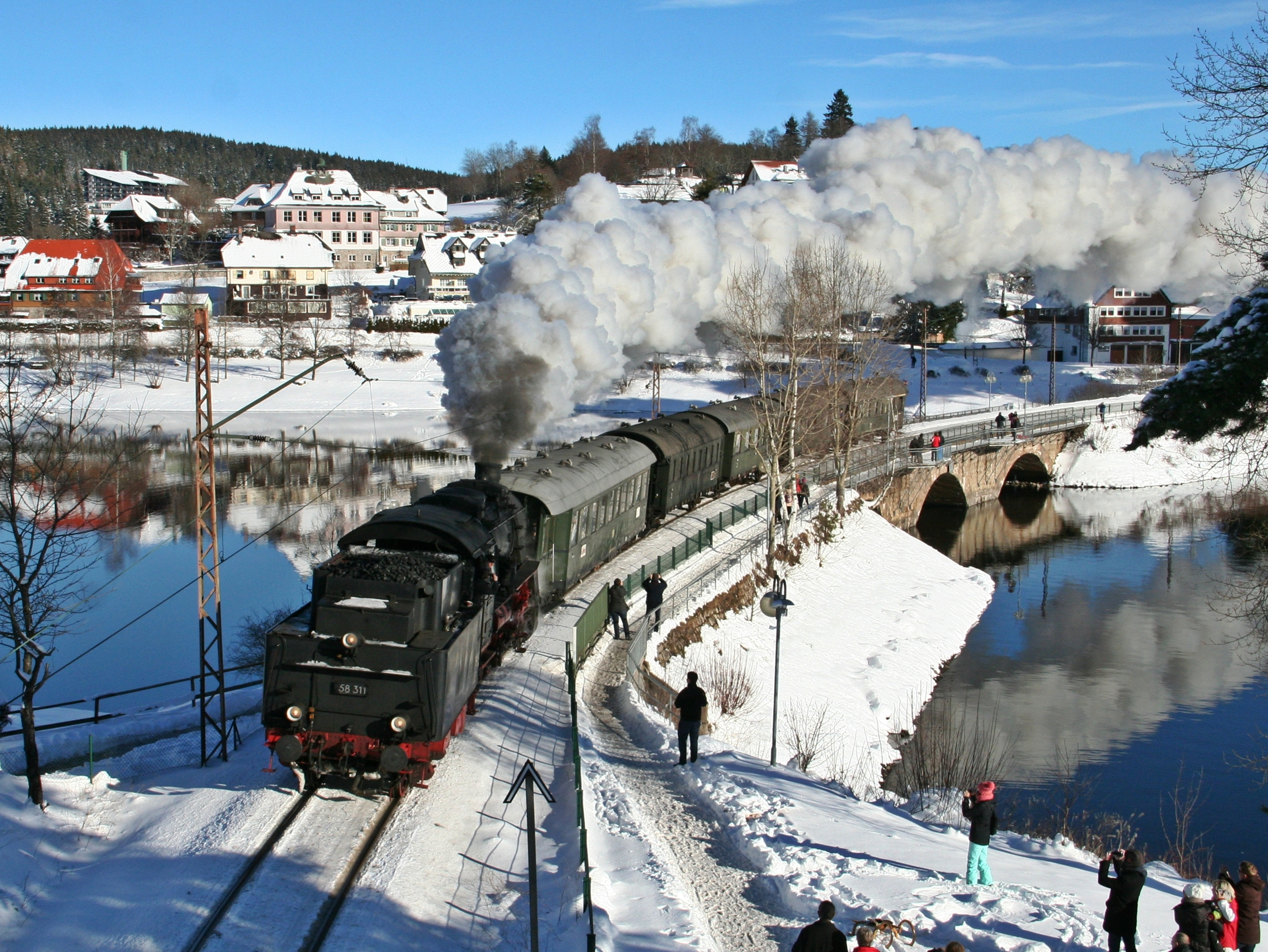
Locomotive 58 311 in Winter 2014/15 at Schluchsee

At the moment the society has to rent locomotives from other heritage railways because it doesn't have its own operational mainline locomotives.

It owns the non-operational E44 1170 (DRG Class E44) and an also non-operational Köf II. A Henschel DEL 110 (called Köe 6043) handed over by Club 41 073 as a permanent loan does all shunting in Seebrugg.

In August 2015, a second, operational Köf II (Köf 6586) was bought and transported to Seebrugg to supersede Köe 6043.

In the long run the society wants to make the original Höllentalbahn steam locomotive 85 007, which at the moment stands in Freiburg as a monument, operational to operate its steam trains with it. The locomotive will be handed over as a permanent loan by the city council of Freiburg as soon as the IG 3-Seenbahn has built a locomotive shed in Seebrugg.

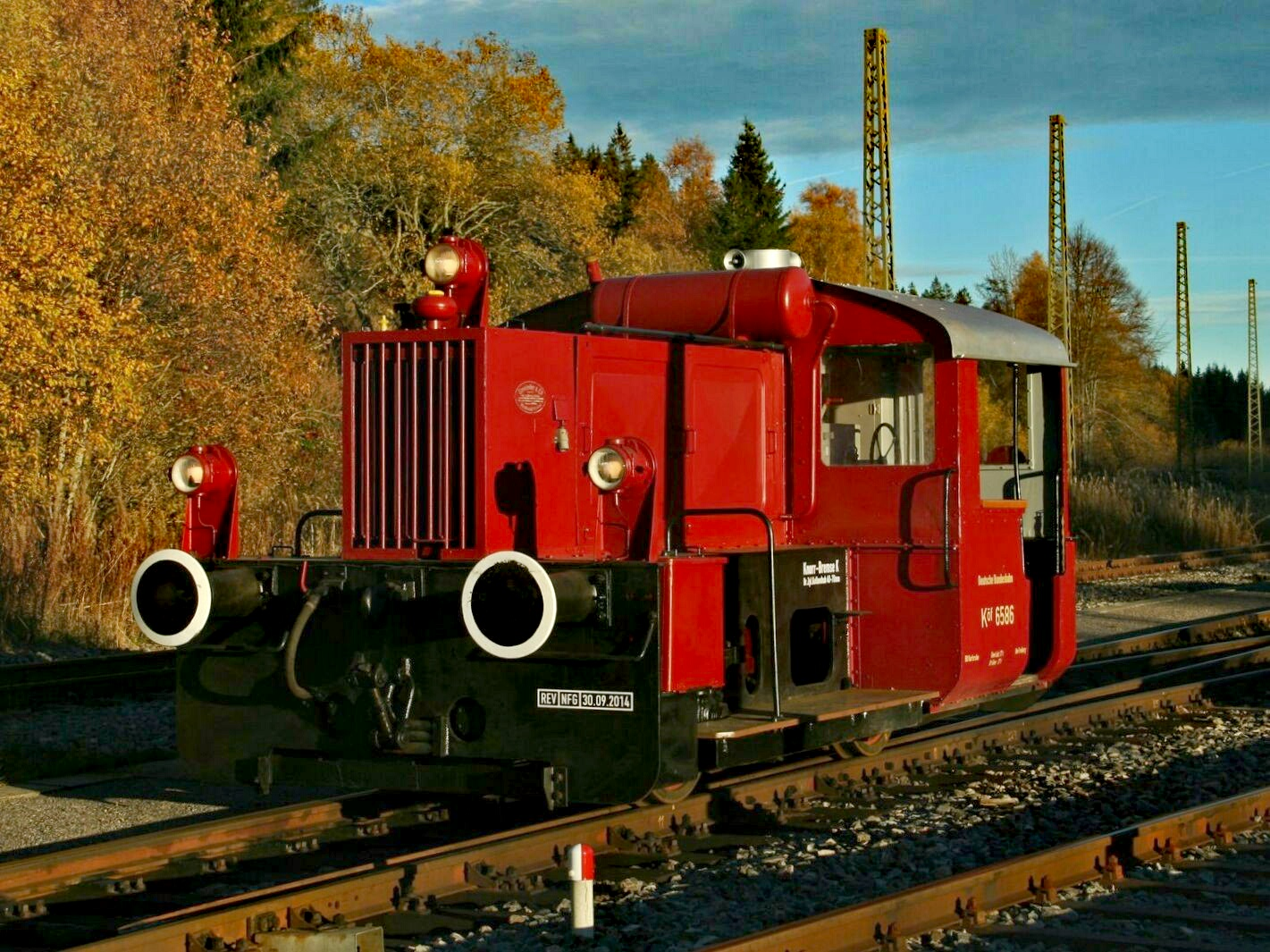
Köf 6586 (Ex DB 323 878–9)

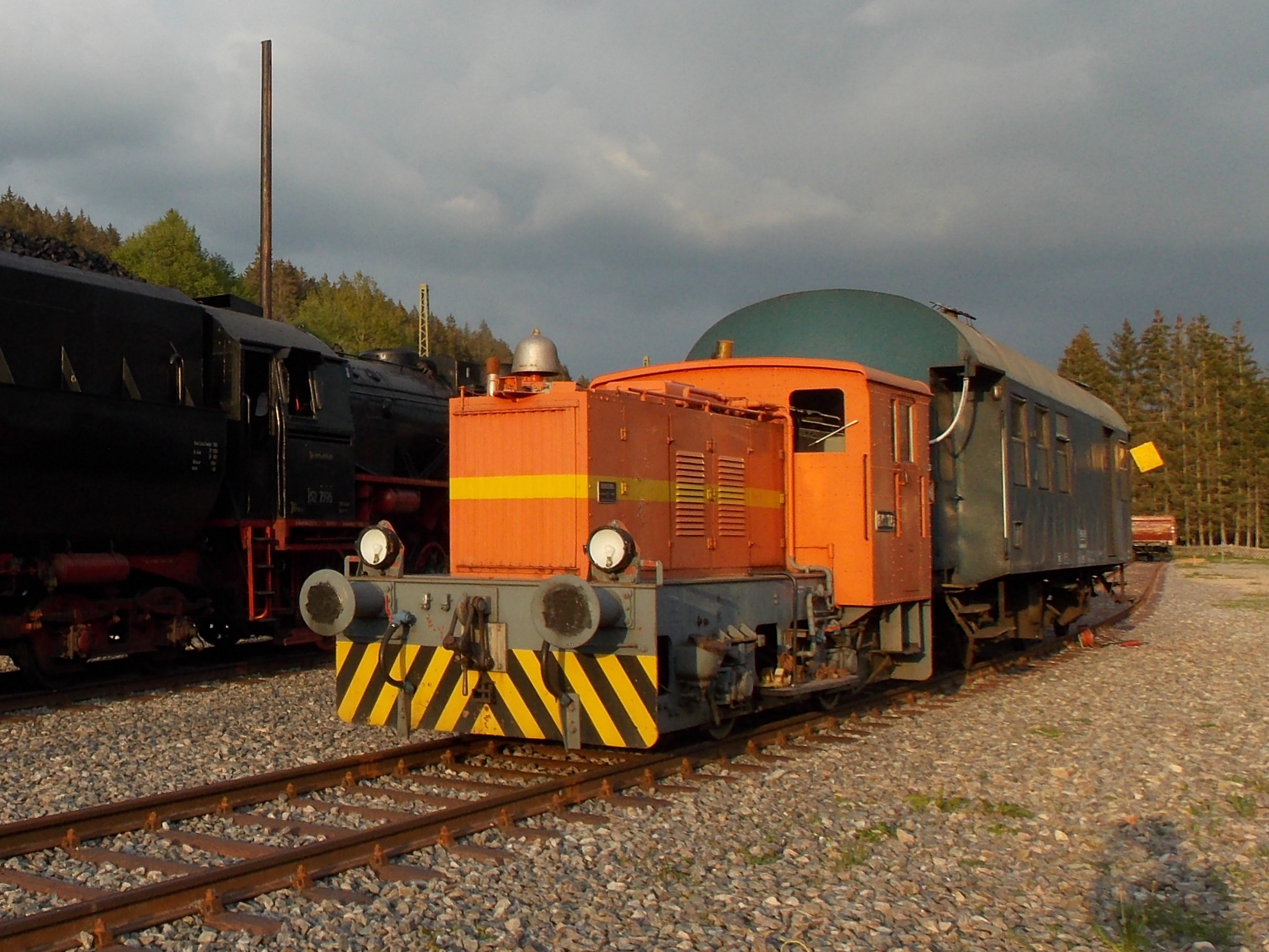
Köe 6043 (DEL 110 24424)

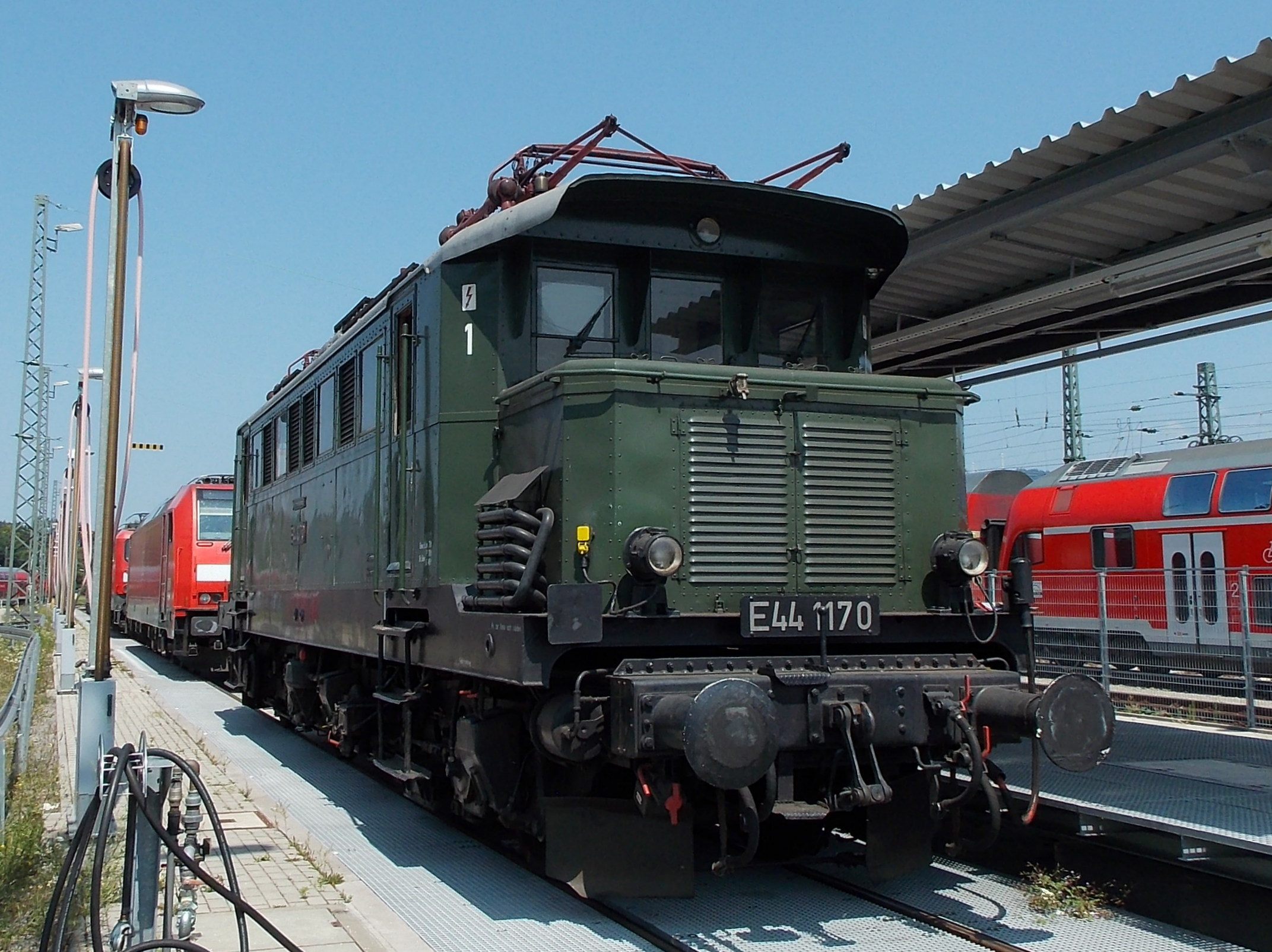
E44 1170

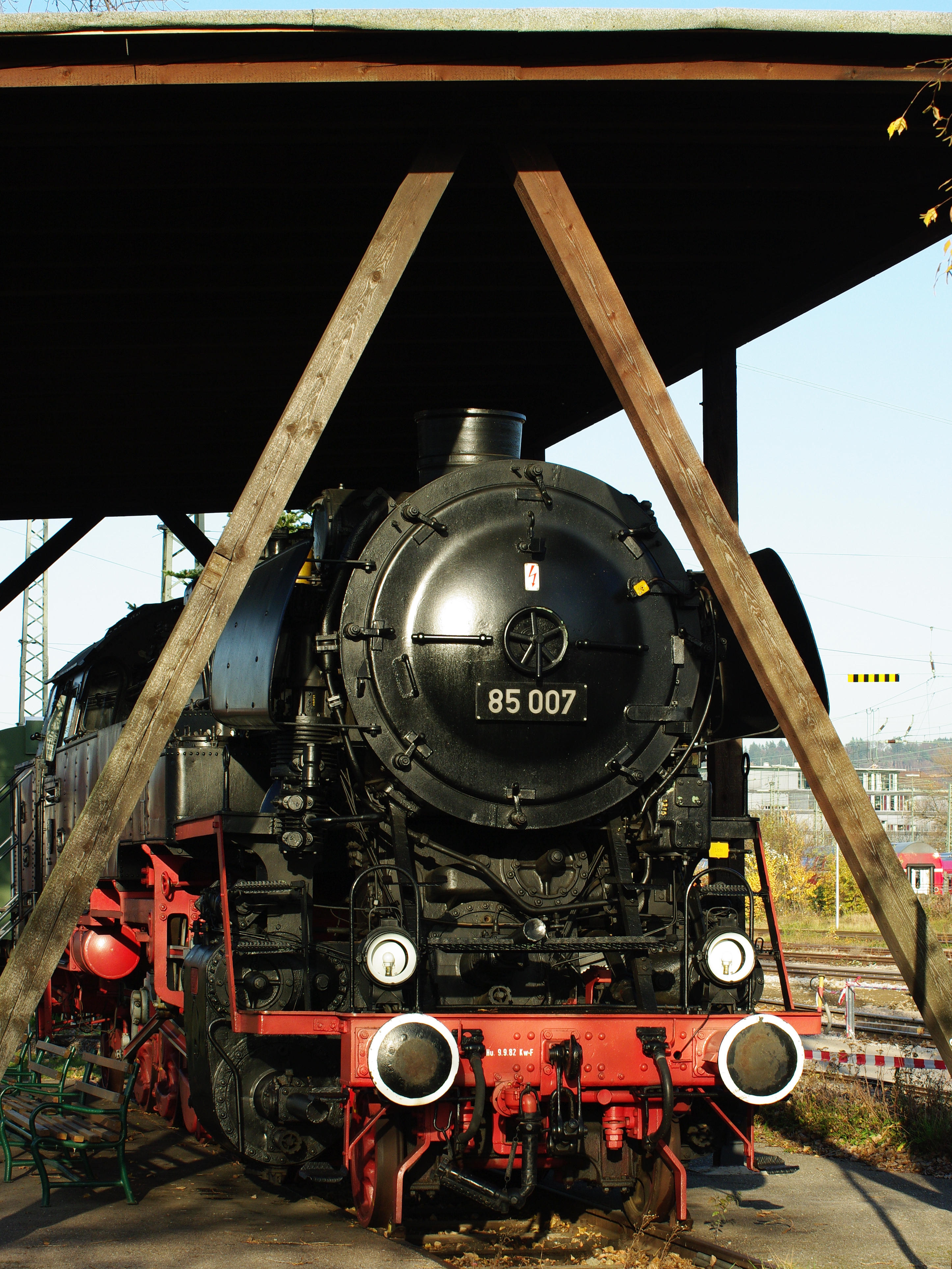
85 007 in Freiburg

=== Passenger cars ===
For operation in the vintage trains the society owns two authentic train sets which will be refurbished part by part. Those are:

- an Eilzug including 5 four-axle Eilzug coaches, which shall be added by one more coach and a four-axle baggage wagon
- a Personenzug (commuter train) including 4 two-axle coaches and a two-axle baggage wagon.

Since January 2015 the society also owns three operational Donnerbüchsen which could be taken over from Schwäbische Albbahn

The currently running passenger cars

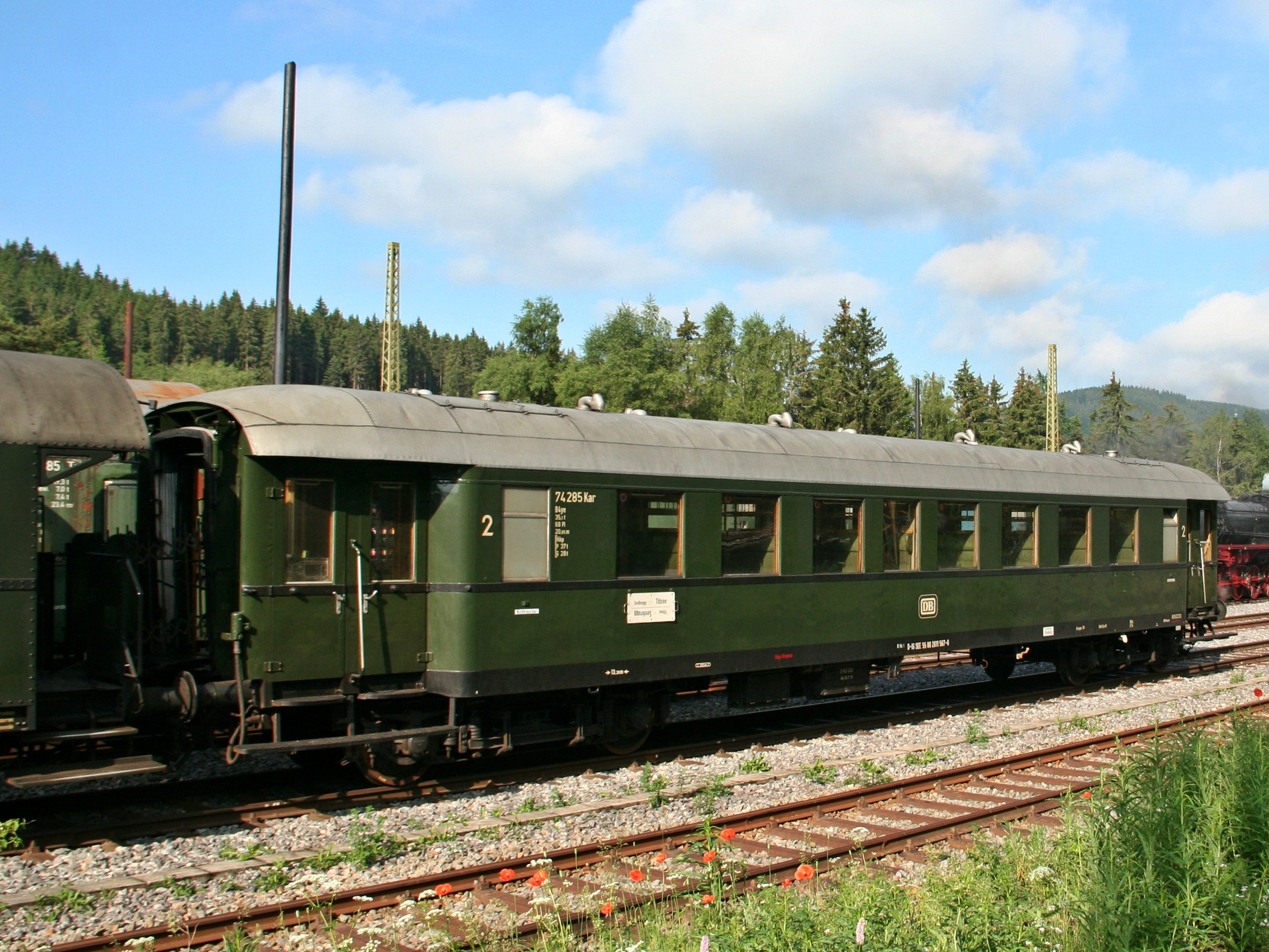
Eilzugwagen 74 285 Kar

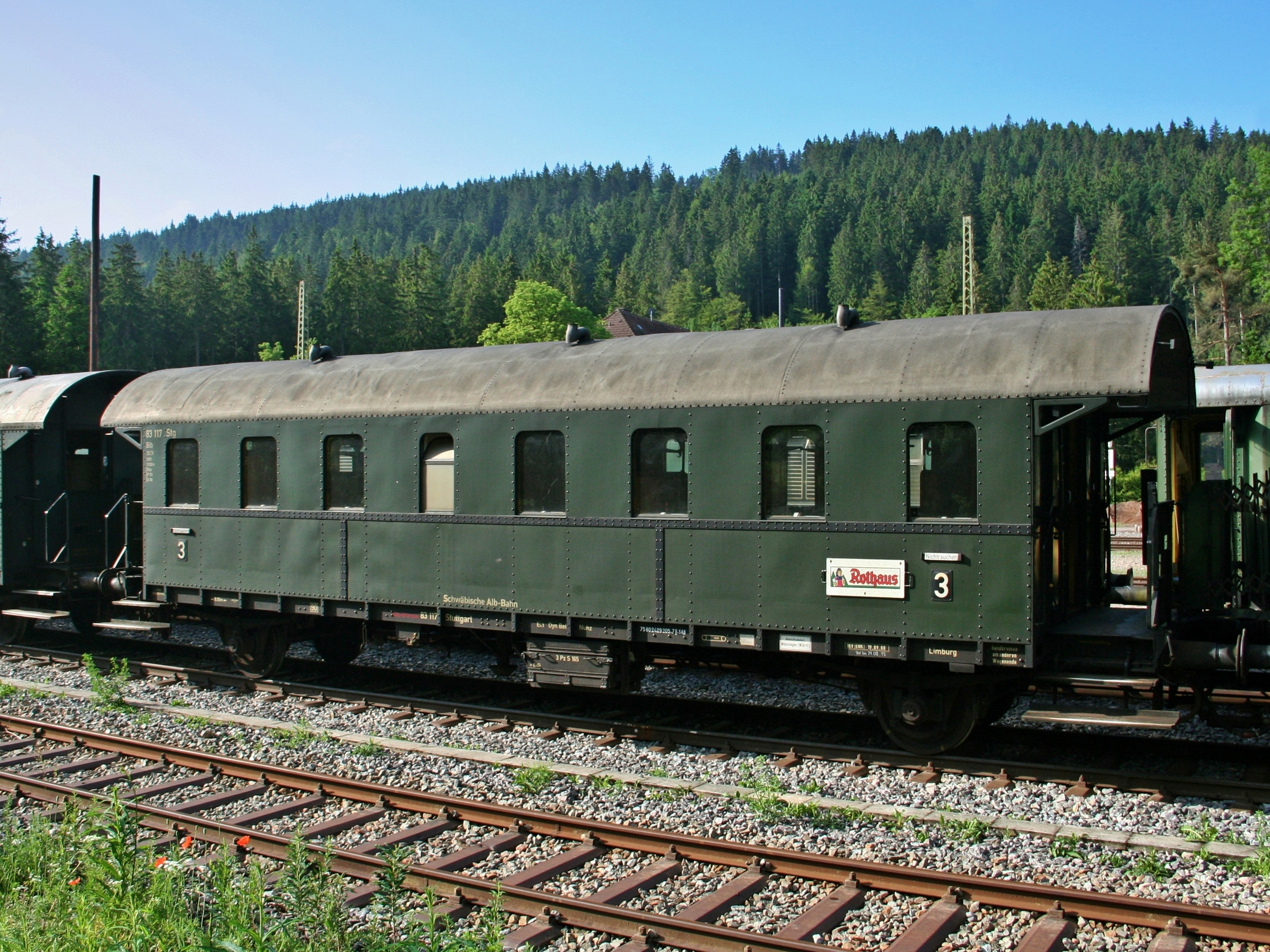
Donnerbüchse 83 117 Stg

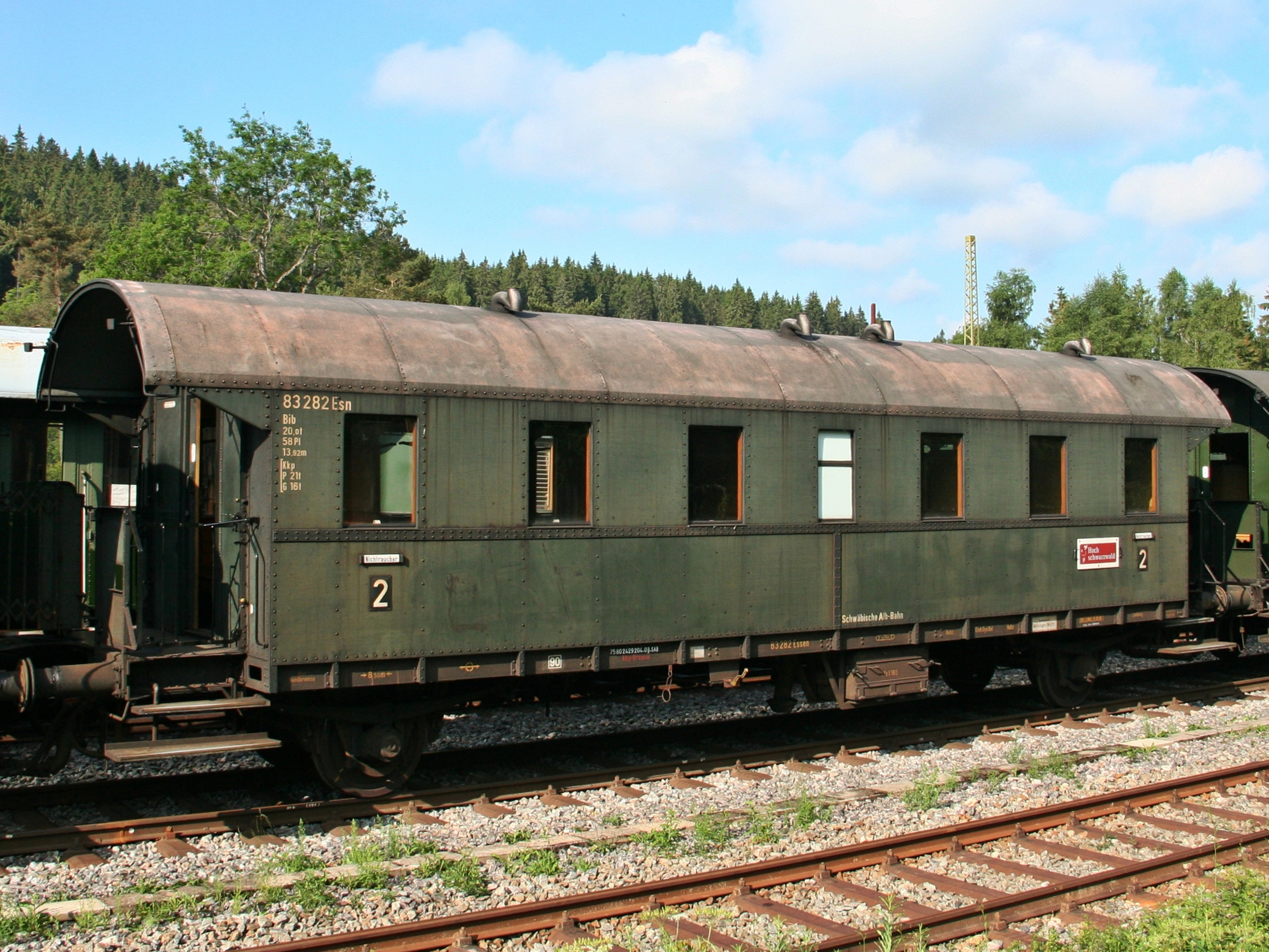
Donnerbüchse 83 282 Esn

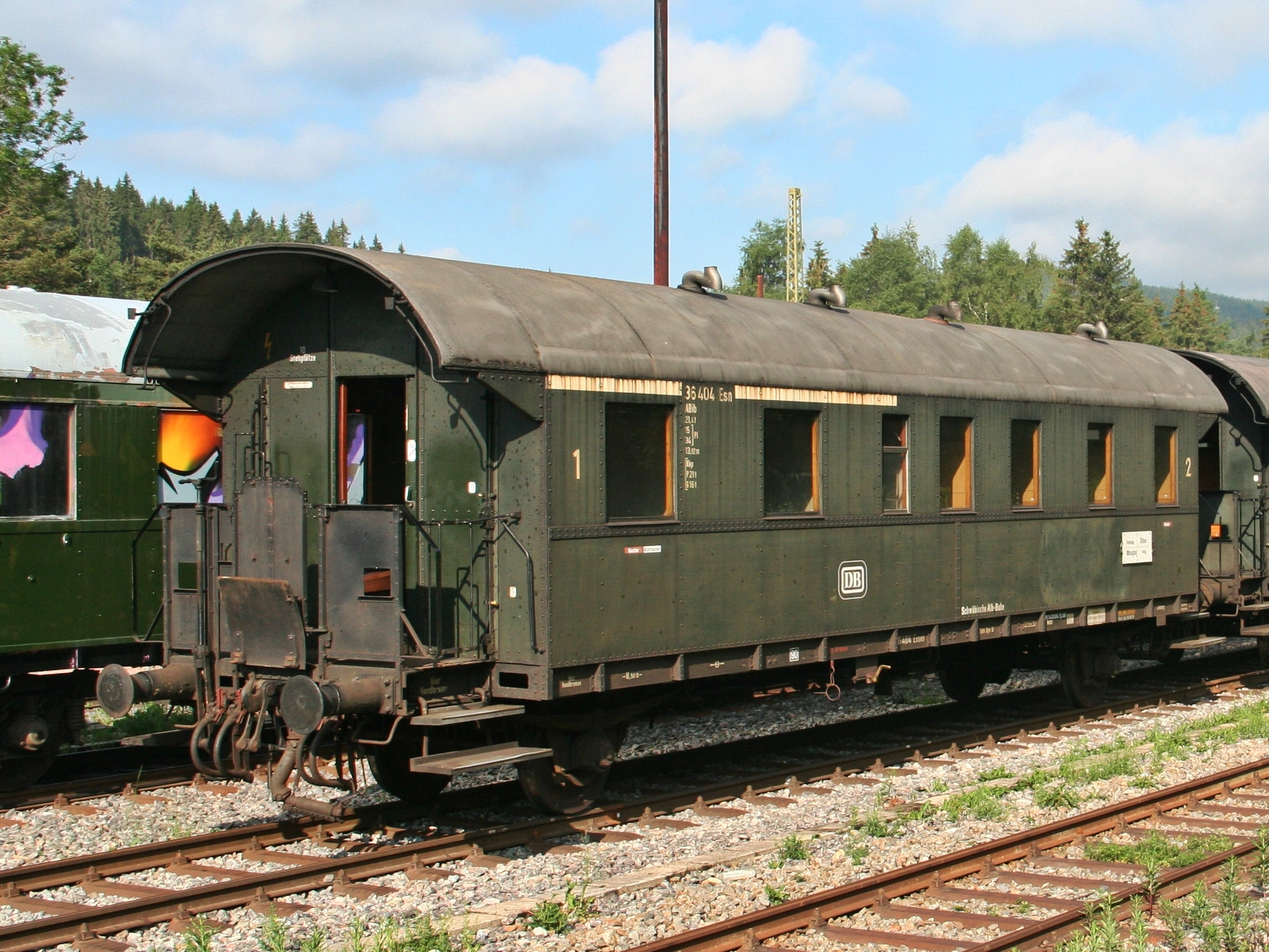
Donnerbüchse 36 404 Esn

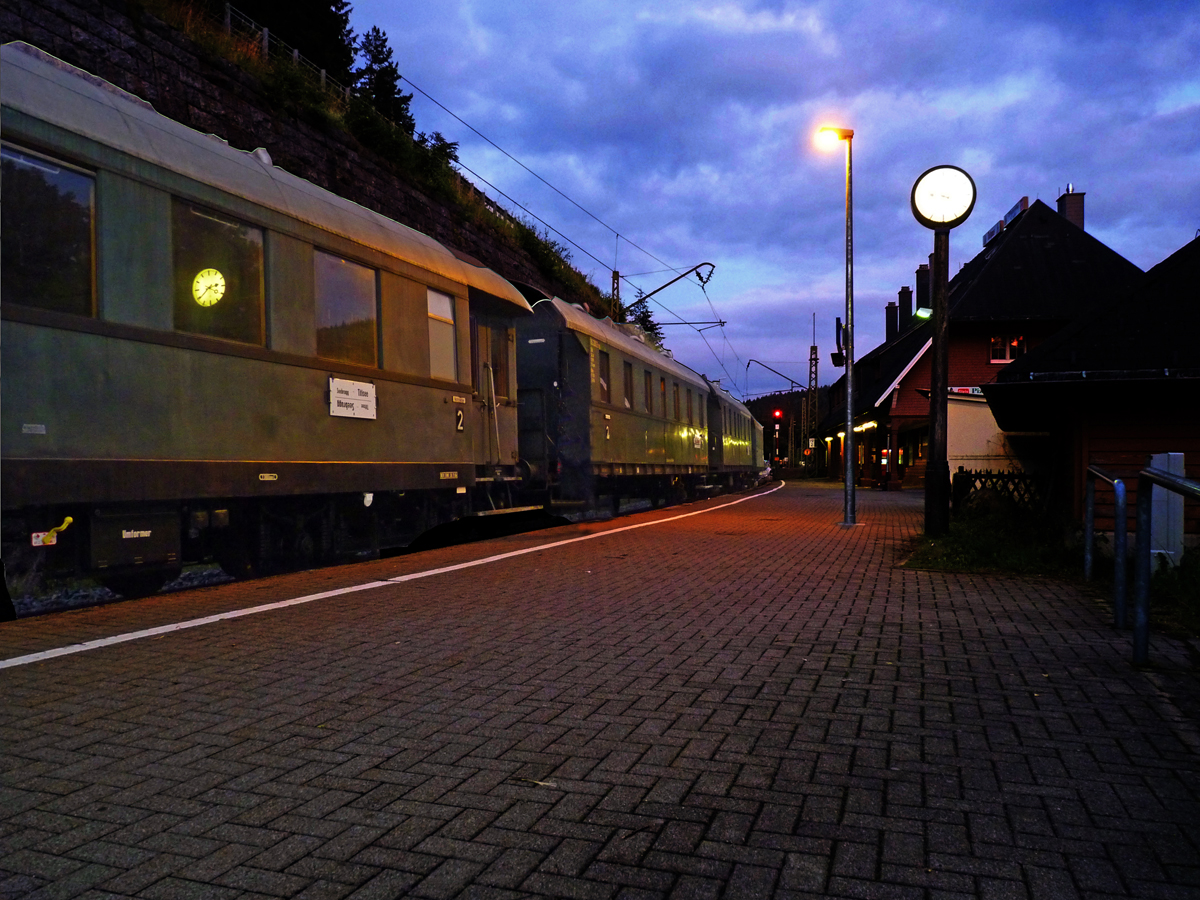
Eilzugwagen 74 770 and the three Donnerbüchsen at Seebrugg passenger station

=== Freight cars ===
The freight car collection includes typical postwar types of freight cars. While some of them contain different exhibitions, others are used as storage. Two freight cars will be worked up to be used as baggage and bike cars.

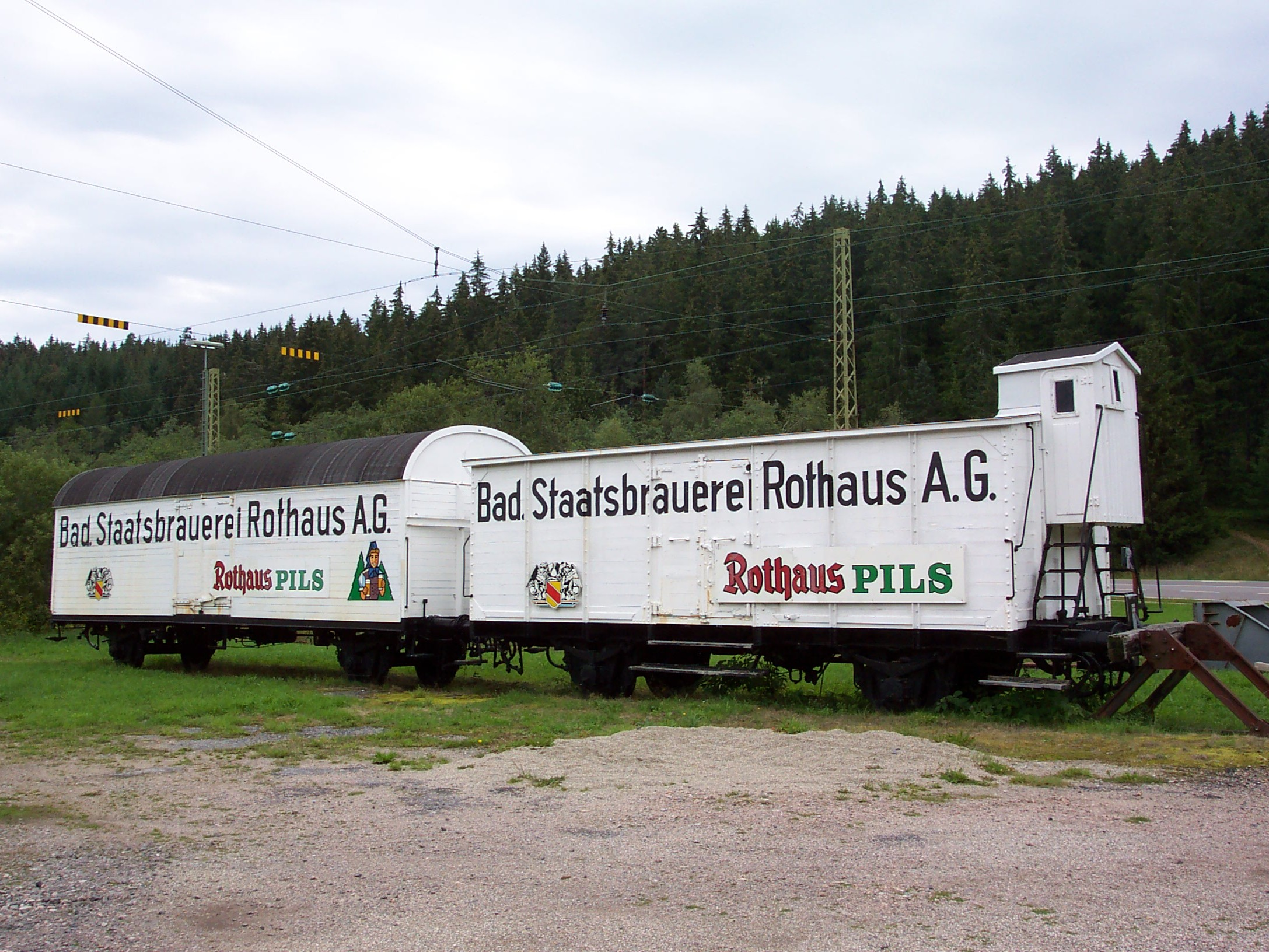
Rothaus beer cooling cars

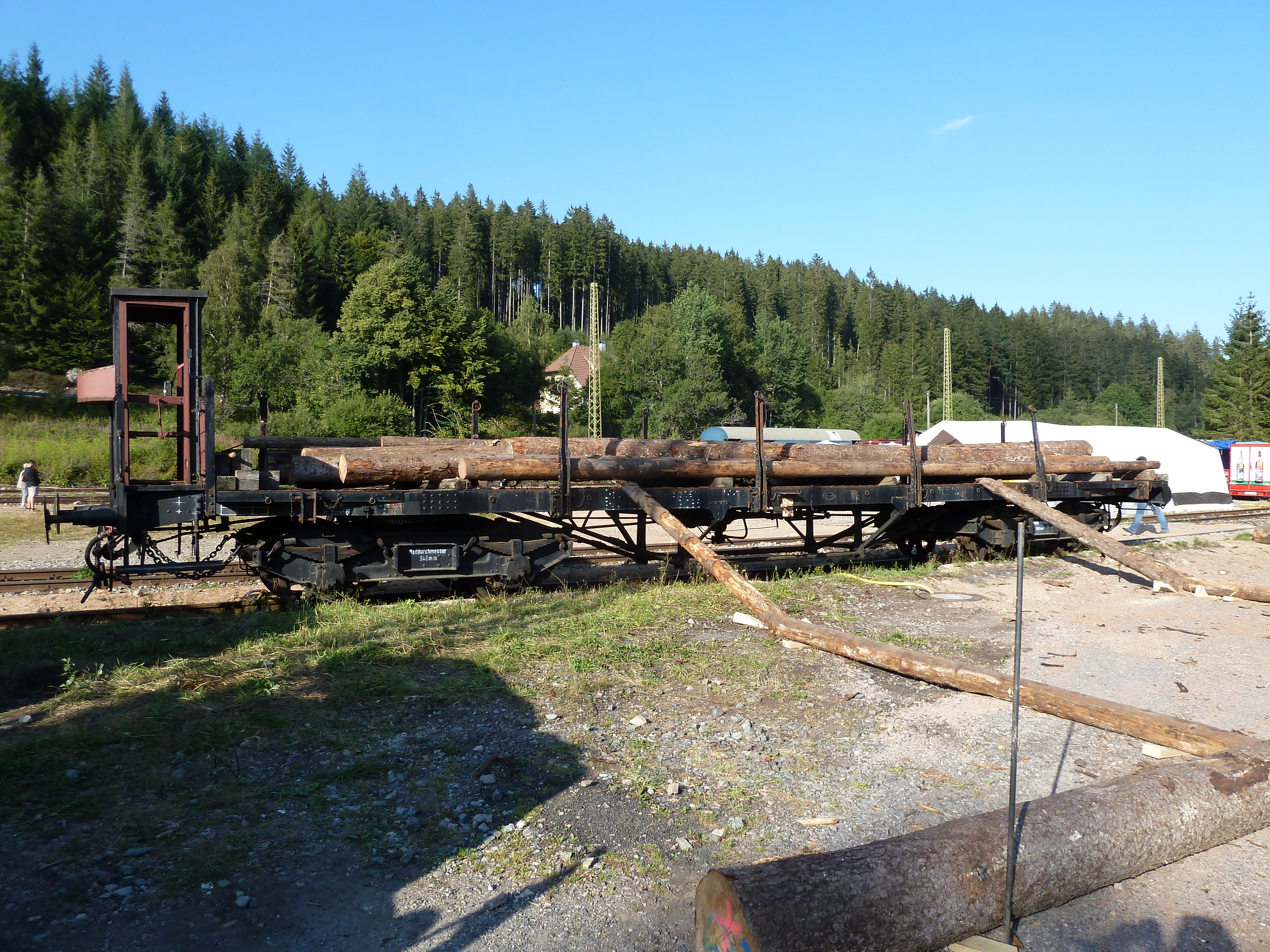
Loading demonstration with wood

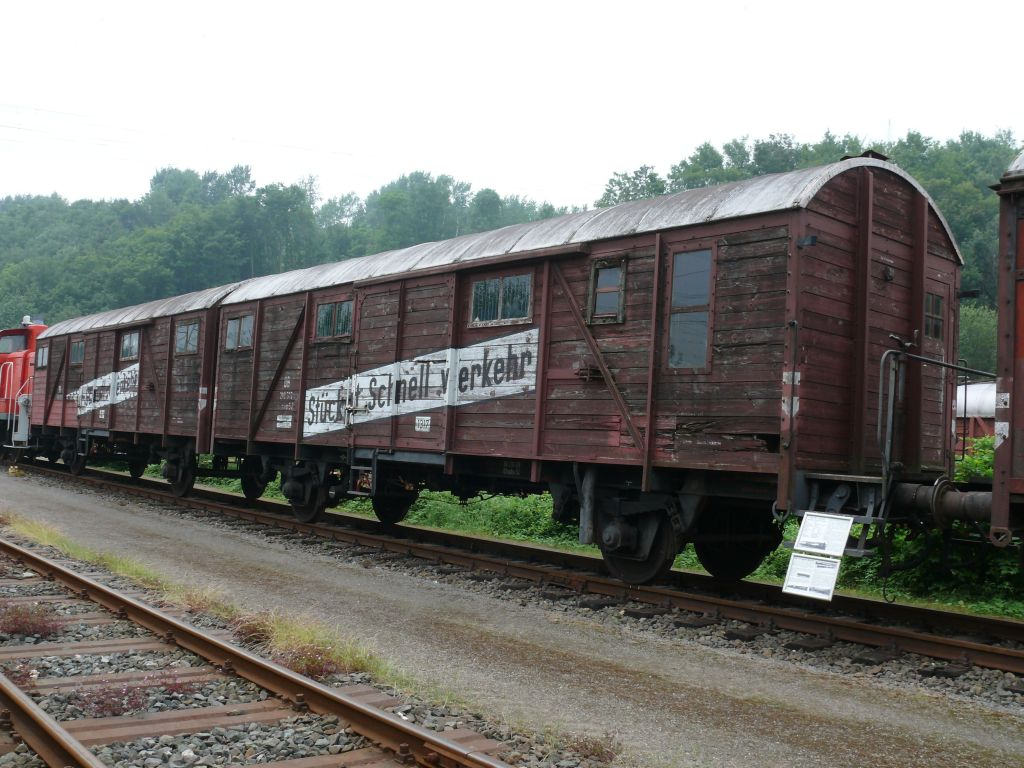
LEIG double freight car for fast cargo traffic, built in the 1950s

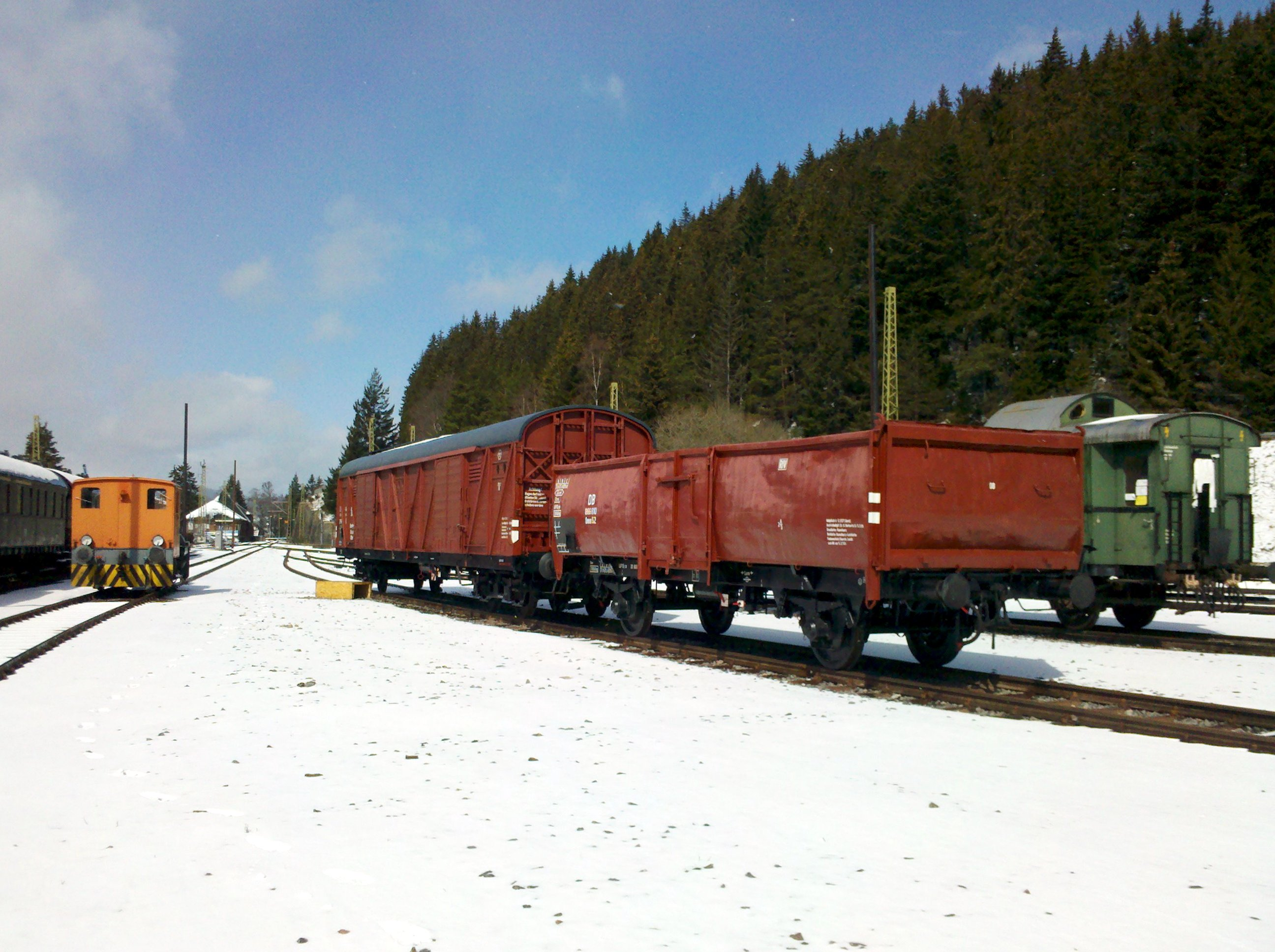
Omm 52 (in the foreground) and GGths Bromberg
