= Villingen-Schwenningen (electoral district) =

State electoral district of Germany

54: Villingen-Schwenningen
- Electoral district for the Landtag of Baden-Württemberg
- Villingen-Schwenningen in 2026
- District: Schwarzwald-Baar-Kreis
- Electorate: 118,984 (2026)
- Major settlements: Bad Dürrheim, Bräunlingen, Brigachtal, Dauchingen, Furtwangen im Schwarzwald, Gütenbach, Königsfeld im Schwarzwald, Mönchweiler, Niedereschach, St. Georgen im Schwarzwald, Schönwald im Schwarzwald, Schonach im Schwarzwald, Triberg im Schwarzwald, Tuningen, Unterkirnach, Villingen-Schwenningen, and Vöhrenbach

Current electoral district
- Party: CDU
- Member: Andreas Braun

Villingen-Schwenningen is an electoral constituency (German: Wahlkreis) represented in the Landtag of Baden-Württemberg.

Since 2026, it has elected one member via first-past-the-post voting. Voters cast a second vote under which additional seats are allocated proportionally state-wide. Under the constituency numbering system, it is designated as constituency 54.

It is wholly within the district of Schwarzwald-Baar-Kreis.

== Geography ==
The constituency includes the municipalities of Bad Dürrheim, Bräunlingen, Brigachtal, Dauchingen, Furtwangen im Schwarzwald, Gütenbach, Königsfeld im Schwarzwald, Mönchweiler, Niedereschach, St. Georgen im Schwarzwald, Schönwald im Schwarzwald, Schonach im Schwarzwald, Triberg im Schwarzwald, Tuningen, Unterkirnach, Villingen-Schwenningen, and Vöhrenbach.

There were 118,984 eligible voters in 2026.

== Members ==
=== First mandate ===
Both prior to and since the electoral reforms for the 2026 election, the winner of the plurality of the vote (first-past-the-post) in every constituency won the first mandate.

Election	Member	Party	%
1976	Erwin Teufel	CDU	
1980	Erwin Teufel	CDU	
1984	Erwin Teufel	CDU	
1988	Erwin Teufel	CDU	
1992	Erwin Teufel	CDU	
1996	Erwin Teufel	CDU	
2001	Erwin Teufel	CDU	54.7
2006	Karl Rombach	CDU	49.4
2011	Karl Rombach	CDU	42.6
2016	Martina Braun	Grüne	31.6
2021	Martina Braun	Grüne	34.6
2026	Andreas Braun	CDU	32.0

=== Second mandate ===
Prior to the electoral reforms for the 2026 election, the seats in the state parliament were allocated proportionately amongst parties which received more than 5% of valid votes across the state. The seats that were won proportionally for parties that did not win as many first mandates as seats they were entitled to, were allocated to their candidates which received the highest proportion of the vote in their respective constituencies. This meant that following some elections, a constituency would have one or more members elected under a second mandate.

Prior to 2011, these second mandates were allocated to the party candidates who got the greatest number of votes, whilst from 2011-2021, these were allocated according to percentage share of the vote.

Election	Member	Party
1976	Adam Berberich	SPD
1980	Hartmut Riepl	SPD
1984	Kurt Kempf	SPD
Jan 1986	Julius Redling	SPD
1988	Julius Redling	SPD
1992	Julius Redling	SPD
1996	Julius Redling	SPD
2001		
2006
2011
2016	Karl Rombach	CDU
2021	Frank Bonath	FDP

== Election results ==
=== 2026 election ===
State election (2026): Villingen-Schwenningen
Notes:	Blue background denotes the winner of the electorate vote. Pink background denotes a candidate elected from their party list. Yellow background denotes an electorate win by a list member, or other incumbent. A ✓ or ✗ denotes status of any incumbent, win or lose respectively.						
Party	Candidate	Votes	%	±%	Party votes	%	±%
CDU	Andreas Braun	25,202	32.0	▲9.4	24,257	30.6	▲8.1
Greens	✗ Martina Braun	19,847	25.2	▼9.5	20,280	25.6	▼9.0
AfD	Martin Rothweiler	19,492	24.7	▲13.4	18,717	23.6	▲12.3
SPD	Nicola Schurr	7,358	9.3	▲0.2	4,178	5.3	▼3.8
FDP	Dirk Eisenbiegler	4,141	5.3	▼6.9	3,408	4.3	▼7.9
Left	Aynur Karlikli	2,737	3.5	▲1.1	2,554	3.2	▲0.9
FW					1,683	2.1	▼0.8
BSW					1,082	1.4	
APT					782	1.0	
Volt					657	0.8	▲0.2
Bündnis C					320	0.4	
PARTEI					274	0.3	
dieBasis					250	0.3	▼0.9
Pensioners					179	0.2	
Values					170	0.2	
ÖDP					105	0.1	▼0.7
Team Todenhöfer					76	0.1	
Verjüngungsforschung					58	0.1	
PdF					50	0.1	
KlimalisteBW					37	0.0	▼0.8
Humanists					28	0.0	
Informal votes		938			570		
Total valid votes		78,777			79,145		
Turnout		79,715	67.0	▲6.4			
CDU gain from Greens	Majority	5,355	6.8				

== See also ==
- Politics of Baden-Württemberg
- Landtag of Baden-Württemberg
