= Baar (region) =

Plateau in southwest Germany

Coordinates: 47°57′N 8°30′E

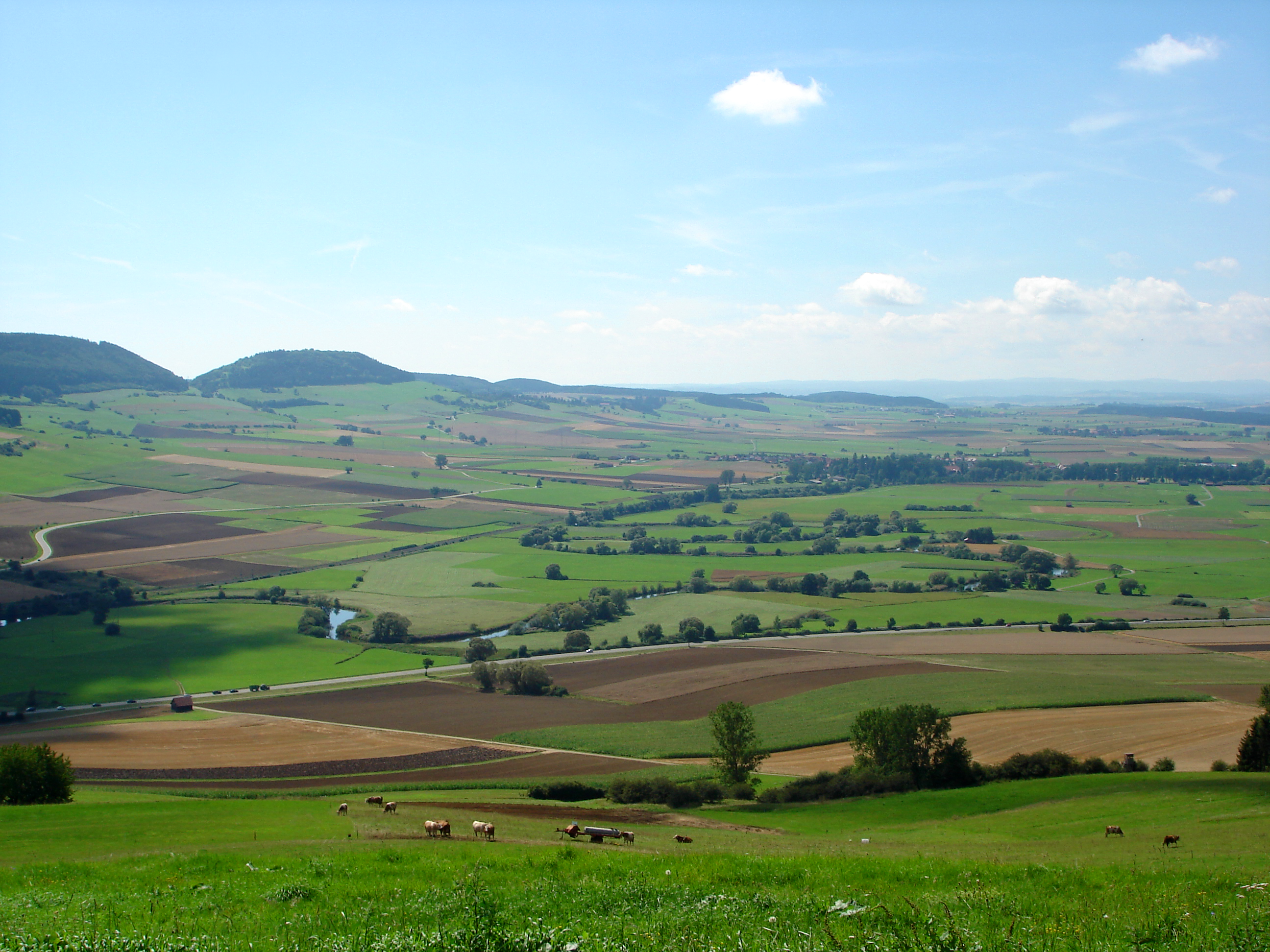
View from Wartenberg to Baar and Danube

The Baar (German pronunciation: [baːɐ̯]) is a plateau that lies 600 to 900 metres above sea level in southwest Germany. It is part of the Table Jura (Tafeljura). It is bordered by the southeastern edge of the Black Forest to the west, the southwestern part of the Swabian Alb known as the Heuberg to the east, and the Randen mountain to the south.

The Baar contains the source of the Neckar (a bog in Villingen-Schwenningen) and the Danube. The sources of the Danube, the Brigach and Breg, originate in Furtwangen im Schwarzwald and Sankt Georgen im Schwarzwald and join the smaller Donaubach in Donaueschingen.

The coldest point in Germany is also located at Donaueschingen in a low cold air basin which experiences its first frost as early as September 20 on average, earlier than the surrounding Black Forest.

== Landscape ==
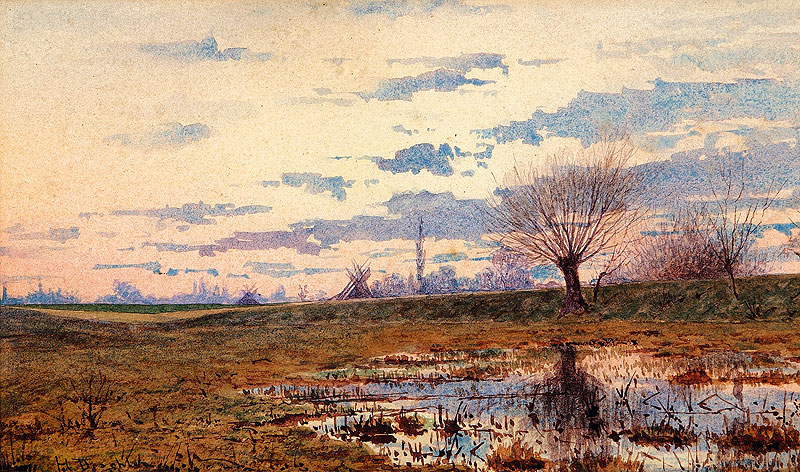
Hermann Dischler (1867–1935): Die Baar

The Baar is composed of several types of landscape. In the west is Baarschwarzwald (the Black Forest), in the center Baarhochmulde (a marshy area), in the south the Wutachland around the Wutach river, and in the east the Baaralb, a low area with buttes of the Swabian Alb like the Hohenkarpfen and the Lupfen, which is the highest point in the Baar at 977 metres.

The Baar makes up the core of the Schwarzwald-Baar-Heuberg administrative region of Baden-Württemberg and contains the district Schwarzwald-Baar-Kreis (except for its northwest portion), the western part of Kreis Tuttlingen, and the southern part of Kreis Rottweil, and juts out into Kreis Breisgau-Hochschwarzwald.

== Cities and towns of the Baar ==
- Baarschwarzwald
  - St. Georgen, Furtwangen, Königsfeld, and Vöhrenbach
- Baarhochmulde
  - Bad Dürrheim, Bräunlingen, Brigachtal, Donaueschingen, Hüfingen, Rottweil, Trossingen and Villingen-Schwenningen
- Baaralb
  - Seitingen-Oberflacht, Blumberg, Geisingen, Hintschingen, Zimmern, Immendingen, Spaichingen, Aldingen and Tuttlingen
- Wutachland
  - Löffingen and Döggingen
View from Fürstenberg to the Baar
