= Stöcklewald =

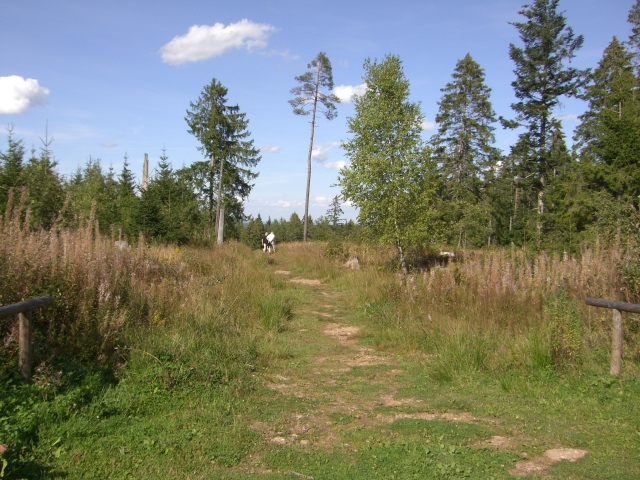
- The Stöcklewald

Highest point
- Elevation: 1,068.2 m above sea level (NHN) (3,505 ft)
- Coordinates: 48°05′30″N 8°15′14″E

Geography
- Location within Baden-Württemberg
- Location: Schwarzwald-Baar-Kreis, Baden-Württemberg, Germany
- Parent range: Black Forest

The Stöcklewald is a mountain, 1,068.2 m above sea level (NHN), in the southern part of the Central Black Forest in Germany between the towns of Furtwangen and Triberg, each about 5 kilometres distant, in the county of Schwarzwald-Baar-Kreis. Towards the north, the Black Forest only exceeds this height again in the area of the Schliffkopf and the Hornisgrinde.

== Location ==
The European Watershed between the Rhine and the Danube runs over the mountain. On its northern slopes rises the Gutach, which flows from here in a northwesterly direction through the Schönwald Highlands and drops over its northeastern edge as the Triberg Waterfalls. To the southeast flow the tributary streams of the Breg.

The northern foot of its gently-sloping domed summit may be reached on local Landesstraßen and Kreisstraßen, both from the aforementioned towns as well as from Schönwald and Brigach. From there a road runs up to the summit, where there is a Gasthaus, a hiker's home belonging to the Black Forest Club and the Stöcklewald Tower.

The parish boundary between the village of Rohrbach (in the borough of Furtwangen) and the municipality of Schönwald runs over the summit. The parish of Nußbach in the borough of Triberg also owns part of the northern mountainside. The summit with its tower and the hiking home lie within the parish of Furtwangen-Rohrbach.

== Stöcklewald Tower ==
The roughly 25-metre-high observation tower was erected in 1894 by the Triberg Branch of the Black Forest Club in the shape of a round tower in the borough of Furtwangen and was inaugurated in May 1895. It is a popular destination on the Middle Way managed by the Black Forest Club. From the observation platform there are views over the Central Black Forest to the Feldberg and also a panorama of the Swabian Jura as well as views of the Alps from the Zugspitze to Mont Blanc. The platform is reached via a staircase with 127 steps.

The Stöcklewald Tower is also used as a communications relay station for police, THW, fire service, rescue services and amateur radio users. The tower also acts as a radio relay station for broadband and internet services to the surrounding parishes.

== Surrounding area ==
Around 800 metres northeast of the summit, near the road on the heights known as Hochgericht (1,020.6 m) are the Triberg Gallows. Another kilometre further northeast is a subpeak of the Stöcklewald, the Kesselberg (1,024.2 m) near an important crossroads. On the slopes of the mountain rises the Brigach stream and its most important tributary, the Kirnach. The Kesselberg Fault that runs through here is named after the mountain. This is a significant reason why the Stöcklewald peak is so clearly uplifted above the eastern slopes of the Black Forest, because it has retained a remnant in the fault zone of the bunter sandstone that originally lay on the basement.

Also in the surrounding area are sights such as St. Hubert's Chapel, a monument to popular religious devotion in an idyllic setting, the Triberg Waterfalls, one of the highest and best known waterfalls in Germany, and the source of the Brigach.
