= Niedereschach =

- Municipality
- Coat of arms

- Location of Niedereschach within Schwarzwald-Baar-Kreis district
- Interactive map of Niedereschach
- Location within Germany Location within Baden-Württemberg
- Coordinates: 48°07′54″N 08°31′38″E
- Country: Germany
- State: Baden-Württemberg
- Admin. region: Freiburg
- District: Schwarzwald-Baar-Kreis

Government
  - Mayor (2018–26): Martin Ragg

Area
  - Total: 33.08 km^{2} (12.77 sq mi)
- Elevation: 625 m (2,051 ft)

Population (2025-12-31)
  - Total: 5,821
  - Density: 176.0/km^{2} (455.8/sq mi)
- Time zone: UTC+01:00 (CET)
  - Summer (DST): UTC+02:00 (CEST)
- Postal codes: 78078
- Dialling codes: 07728
- Vehicle registration: VS
- Website: www.niedereschach.de

Niedereschach is a municipality, with 6000 inhabitants, in the district of Schwarzwald-Baar in Baden-Württemberg in Germany.

== Geography ==
Niedereschach lies in the Eschach valley on the eastern edge of the Black Forest between 620 and 720 metres above sea level between the county town of Villingen-Schwenningen and the town of Rottweil.

=== Neighbouring municipalities ===
The parish is bounded in the north by municipality of Zimmern ob Rottweil and in the east by Deißlingen, both in the county of Rottweil, and in the south by Dauchingen and Villingen-Schwenningen and in the west by Königsfeld im Schwarzwald. Within the parish lie the villages of:

- Niedereschach
- Kappel
- Schabenhausen
- Fischbach

=== Municipal divisions ===
With the municipality of Niedereschach with the former independent parishes of Fischbach, Kappel and Schabenhausen there are 33 village, hamlets, farmsteads and houses.
To the former parish of Fischbach belong the villages of Fischbach and Sinkingen, the hamlet of Vorderweiler, the farmstead of Pfaffenberg(höfe) and the houses of Auf dem Bühl, Eichbühl and Kirchhalde.
To the old paris of Kappel belong the village of Kappel itself, the farmstead of Winkelhof (Im Winkel) and Haus Dobel.
To the parish of Niedereschach in the boundaries of the 1970s municipal reform belong the village of Niedereschach itself, the farms of Klosterhof (formerly Seyhof) and Mühle and the houses of Am Eichenberg, An der Schabenhäuserhalde, Bubenholz, Ebersteinerhof, Oberer Vogelsang, Pulvermühle, Granegg Castle and Vogelsang. To the former parish of Schabenhausen belong the hamlets of Altbad, Auf den Höfen, Bei der Mühle, Im oberen Loh, Kohlerberg, Kohlwald, Mittendorf (Beim Neubad), Unterdorf (Bei der Krone), the farms of Hasenstall, Lohhof and Schlössle and the dwelling place of Bärleswies.

== History ==
Niedereschach was first mentioned in the records in 1086. In the course of its history it became an estate of the abbeys of Gengenbach and St. Georgen and of the free imperial town of Rottweil. In 1805 the village became part of the Duchy of Württemberg and, in 1810, transferred to the Grand Duchy of Baden.

In addition, Granegg Castle is supposed to have stood on the mountain between Fischbach and Schabenhausen, until the Middle Ages. A road was named after this castle, the Graneggstraße.

== Demographics ==
Population development:

Year	Inhabitants
1990	4,936
2001	5,922
2011	5,813
2021	5,980
