= Brigach =

River in Germany

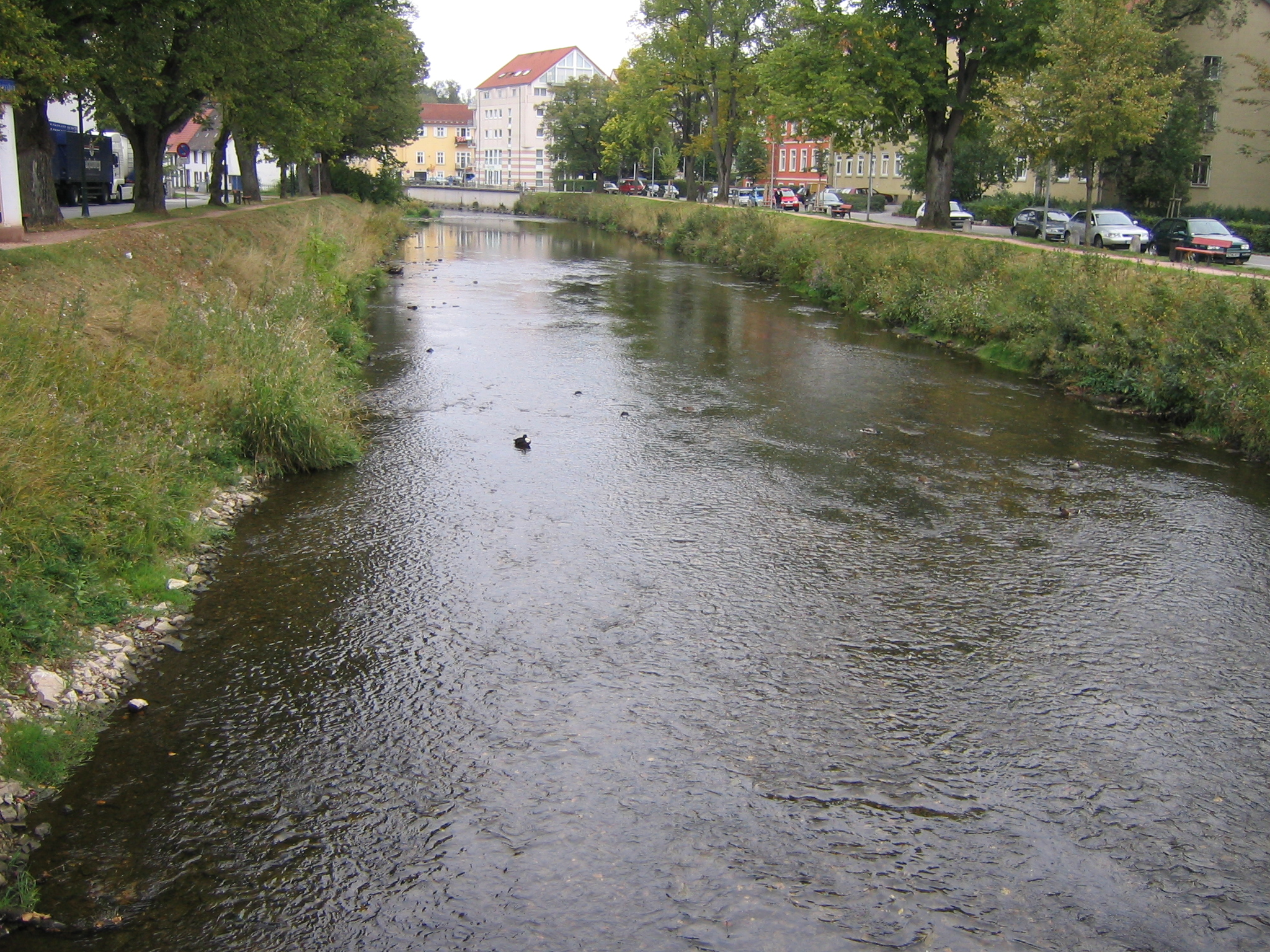
- The Brigach in Donaueschingen

Location
- Country: Germany
- State: Baden-Württemberg
- District: Schwarzwald-Baar-Kreis
- Reference no.: DE: 1112

Physical characteristics
- Source
  - location: in Brigach near St. Georgen im Schwarzwald
  - coordinates: 48°06′24″N 8°16′51″E
  - elevation: ca. 925 m above sea level (NHN)
- Mouth
  - location: Confluence: with the Breg to form the Danube east of Donaueschingen
  - coordinates: 47°57′03″N 8°31′13″E
  - elevation: ca. 672 m above sea level (NN)
- Length: 40.4 km (25.1 mi)
- Basin size: 196.7 km^{2} (75.9 sq mi)
- Discharge
  - location: at Donaueschingen / Brigach gauge
  - average: 3.21 m^{3}/s (113 cu ft/s)
  - minimum: Record low: 250 L/s (8.8 cu ft/s) (in 1997); Average low: 500 L/s (18 cu ft/s)

Basin features
- Progression: Danube→ Black Sea
- Landmarks: Large towns: Villingen-Schwenningen, Donaueschingen; Small towns: St. Georgen im Schwarzwald; Villages: Unterkirnach, Brigachtal

The Brigach is the shorter of two streams that jointly form the river Danube in Baden-Württemberg, Germany. The Brigach has its source at 925 m (3,035 ft) above sea level within St. Georgen in the Black Forest. The Brigach crosses the city Villingen-Schwenningen. 40.4 km (25.1 mi) from the source, the Brigach joins the Breg in Donaueschingen to form the Danube River.

== Name ==
The name Brigach is of Celtic origin and means "light coloured, pure water". A relief found here points to the goddess, Abnoba.

== Geography ==
=== Sources ===
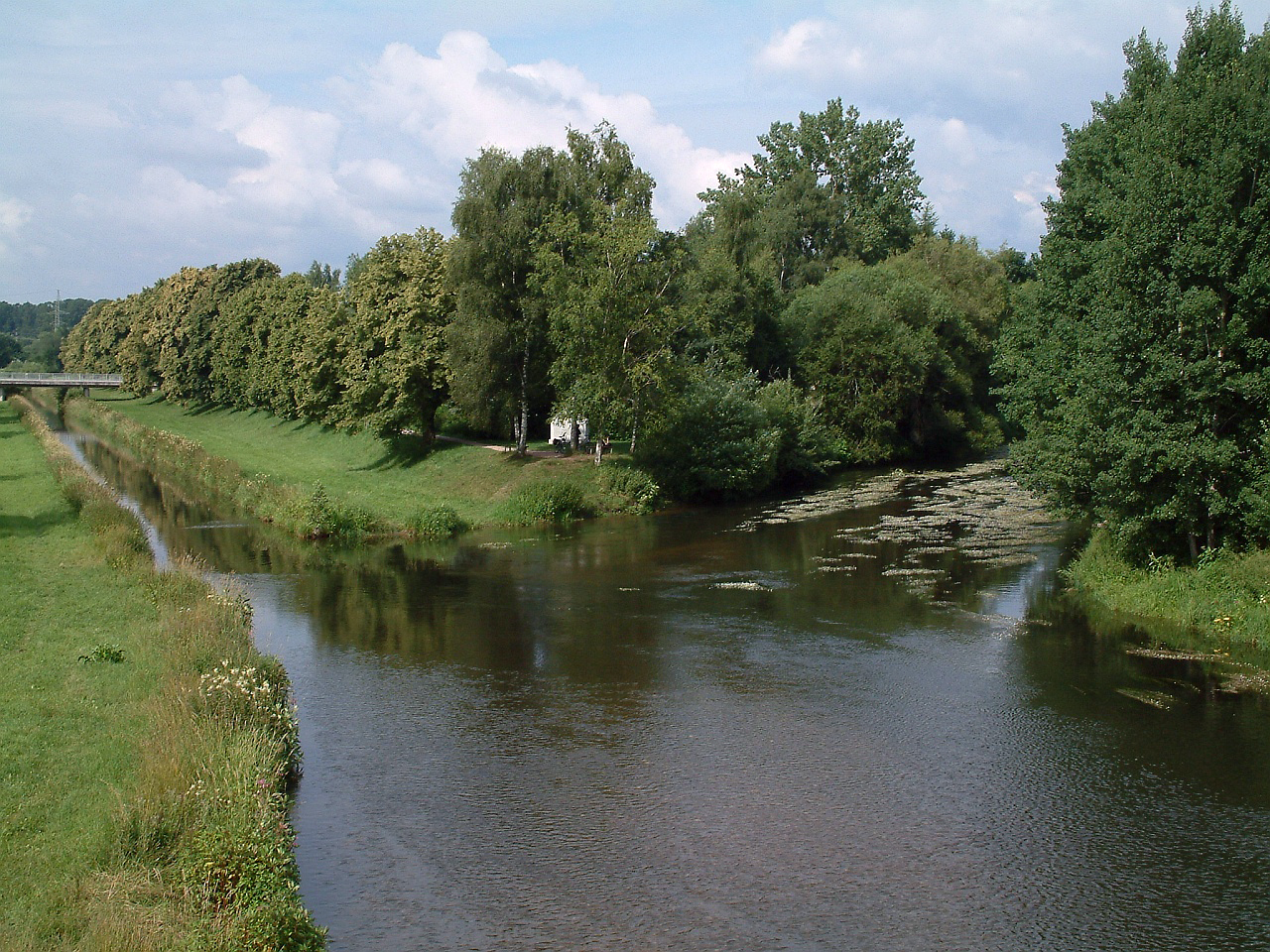
Confluence with the Breg (left) to form the Danube (foreground)

One source of the Brigach is impounded in the cellar of a farmhouse in the upper valley near the village of Brigach and may be visited by the public. On the official state water map the Brigach begins, however, at a height of about 925 m above sea level (NHN) somewhat below a small pond near this farm in the borough of Sankt Georgen im Schwarzwald.

== Course ==
The Brigach flows initially along a gently descending course and roughly east-north-east through the landscape of the Black Forest, which consists here of open fields across the width of the valley with woods on the accompanying heights, before reaching the first large village of Sankt Georgen. From here Baden's Black Forest Railway runs down to the mouth of the valley. In Sankt Georgen, the river is already 100 metres below the surrounding highland and it now swings slowly around the woods of the Röhlinswald on the right to head southeast through a typical high Black Forest landscape of scattered settlements. By the place where the Brigach is joined from the WNW by its first long tributary, the Röhlinsbach, it leaves the parish of Sankt Georgen and enters a valley called the Groppertal, a protected landscape about half a square kilometre in area, which lies within the municipality of Unterkirnach and the town of Villingen-Schwenningen. It continues down the valley until it is joined, near Kirnach railway station outside the village of Villingen, by its most important tributary, the Kirnach which has a length of over 12 kilometres and a catchment of 33 km^{2}. In this area the Birgach runs for just under a quarter of a kilometre alongside the railway line which itself runs close to the right side of the valley, below the hillside.

Shortly thereafter, the Brigach leaves the Black Forest behind, about halfway along its course, and enters the much flatter Baar region near Villingen, which is dominated by open countryside, with larger settlements than in its upper reaches. In the middle of the town, it changes direction to the south and receives a number of tributaries from the north, of which two are from the Black Forest to the west and are more than 10 kilometres long: the Warenbach, whose confluence is in the borough of Villingen, and the Holenbach whose confluence is in the next municipality of Brigachtal. Below the village of Klengen, the Brigach passes over the boundary of the district into the borough of Donaueschingen. Once again, the valley passes through wooded hills, the river develops meanders and then swings left on an easterly course through the urban part of the borough. In the left-hand part of the castle park, a karst spring, which has been regarded as a source of the Danube for centuries and whose upper reaches are called the Donaubach ("Danube Stream") is routed underground through the park into the Brigach. Its confluence is marked by a temple dedicated to the former German Emperor, Kaiser William II. Compared with its two headstreams, this source of the Danube is, however, hydrologically insignificant. A mile and a half east of the Donaubach spring, the Brigach unites with the Breg, a river which joins from the right and originates in the High Black Forest, to form the River Danube.

The Brigach descends through more than 250 metres during its course which is approximately 40.5 kilometres long.

== Catchment ==
The Brigach's catchment covers an area of 196.7 km^{2} and lies entirely within the county of Schwarzwald-Baar-Kreis, almost two-thirds within the Black Forest, the remaining eastern area is part of the Baar. Within its catchment the Brigach flows very close to its northern and then eastern side. Through the centre of the catchment is the Kirnach which flows very consistently towards the south-southeast and rises very close to the source of the Brigach. The watershed, which is close to the Kirnach to the northwest, separates it from the catchment of the Gutach which flows via the Kinzig into the River Rhine and, in its subsequent northeasterly course from the Schiltach to the upper Kinzig. Beyond the long northeastern watershed the upper Neckar and its tributaries also drain into the Rhine. On the remaining outer edge of the catchment, by contrast, precipitation flows into the Danube. In front of the short southeastern boundary there are only a few significant tributaries into this river. Beyond the long southwestern perimeter lies the considerably larger catchment (291.5 km^{2}) of the right-hand Danube tributary, the Breg.

The highest point in the catchment is about a kilometre southwest of the source on the summit of the Kesselberg (1,024.2 m above NN). This is the tripoint of the catchments of the Gutach to the northwest, the Brigach to the east and the Breg to the southwest.

=== Tributaries ===
This list shows those tributaries that are over 3.0 km long, together with the direction and location of their confluence. They are listed in order from source to mouth. For the full list of tributaries with additional data, see de:Liste der Zuflüsse der Brigach.

- Röhlinbach (right, Stockburg Mill, St. Georgen)
- Kirnach (right, Kirnach railway station, Villingen-Schwenningen)
- Krebsgraben (left, Villingen)
- Ziegelbach (left, Villingen)
- Steppach (left, Villingen)
- Warenbach (right, Villingen)
- Talbach (left, Villingen-Marbach)
- Holenbach (right, Brigachtal-Kirchdorf)

== See also ==
- List of rivers of Baden-Württemberg
