= Black Forest Railway (Baden) =

Railway line in southern Germany from Offenburg to Singen

Overview
- Native name: Schwarzwaldbahn
- Line number: 4250
- Locale: Baden-Württemberg, Germany

Service
- Route number: 720

Technical
- Line length: 149.1 km (92.6 mi)
- Track gauge: 1,435 mm (4 ft 8 1/2 in) standard gauge
- Operating speed: 140 km/h (87 mph)

The Baden Black Forest Railway (German: Schwarzwaldbahn, pronounced [ˈʃvaʁtsvaltˌbaːn]) is a twin-track, electrified railway line in Baden-Württemberg, Germany, running in a NW-SE direction to link Offenburg on the Rhine Valley Railway (Rheintalbahn) with Singen on the High Rhine Railway (Hochrheinbahn). Passing directly across the Black Forest, through spectacular scenery, the route is 150 km long, ascends 650 metres from lowest to highest elevation, and passes through 39 tunnels and over 2 viaducts. It is still the only true mountain railway in Germany to be built with two tracks, and is the most important railway line in the Black Forest. It was built between 1863 and 1873, utilizing plans drawn up by Robert Gerwig.

This line should not be confused with the Württemberg Black Forest Railway (Schwarzwaldbahn (Württemberg)), which runs between Stuttgart and Calw in Germany.

== Geographical and economic significance ==
By cutting straight through the Black Forest, the Black Forest Railway shortened the trip between Offenburg and Singen, which had been connected by the Baden Mainline (Badische Hauptbahn), from 240 km to 150 km. The route is currently operated by a regular service of Deutsche Bahn RegionalExpress trains, using double-decker rolling stock, which allow excellent views. The trains continue southwards from Singen on the High Rhine Railway to Konstanz and across the Swiss border to Kreuzlingen, and northwards to Karlsruhe along the Rhine Valley Railway. In addition, the line is utilized by a daily Intercity between Konstanz and Hamburg-Altona.

This route was also economically significant for the small communities in the southern part of the Black Forest. For many localities, which, prior to the advent of train service, were only accessible via horse-drawn carriages, this development was key to their industrialization. From the end of the 19th century, until World War I, the manufacture of clocks in the Black Forest saw its economic heyday, and this industry marks the local economy even today. Not only the residents of towns directly on the line, such as St. Georgen, Hornberg, Villingen-Schwenningen, and Donaueschingen, were beneficiaries of train service, but even Furtwangen or Schramberg, which are not far away, profited. The line is also significant in terms of tourism.

== History ==
=== Planning phase ===
The first plans for a railway line right across the central Black Forest had been drawn up in the 1840s. However, these initial plans did not come to fruition, mainly because the technical expertise necessary to build this complex and expensive line was not yet available.

Originally, the Black Forest line was intended as a feeder line to the Swiss Gotthardbahn, across the first German-Swiss border crossing near Waldshut and Koblenz. Geological issues in the Wutach Valley prevented taking a path in a southerly direction from Donaueschingen, and trains took a lengthy detour around the Swiss Canton of Schaffhausen to reach Singen, near Lake Constance, which was the ultimate destination.

After settling on Offenburg as the starting point, and Singen as the destination, three variations on the line were examined:

1. the Bregtallinie via Furtwangen and alongside the Breg river,
2. the Sommeraulinie via Hornberg and Triberg
3. the Schiltachlinie via Wolfach, Schiltach and Schramberg.

The Bregtallinie option was eliminated first, due to its expense and complexity. From an engineering perspective, it was actually the Schiltachlinie that turned out to be easiest to execute; however, because that line would have run through Schramberg, in Württemberg, and would not have been located solely in Baden, the final decision was made to utilize the Sommeraulinie. Railway engineer Robert Gerwig was tasked with the creation of the track layout plans.

=== Construction ===
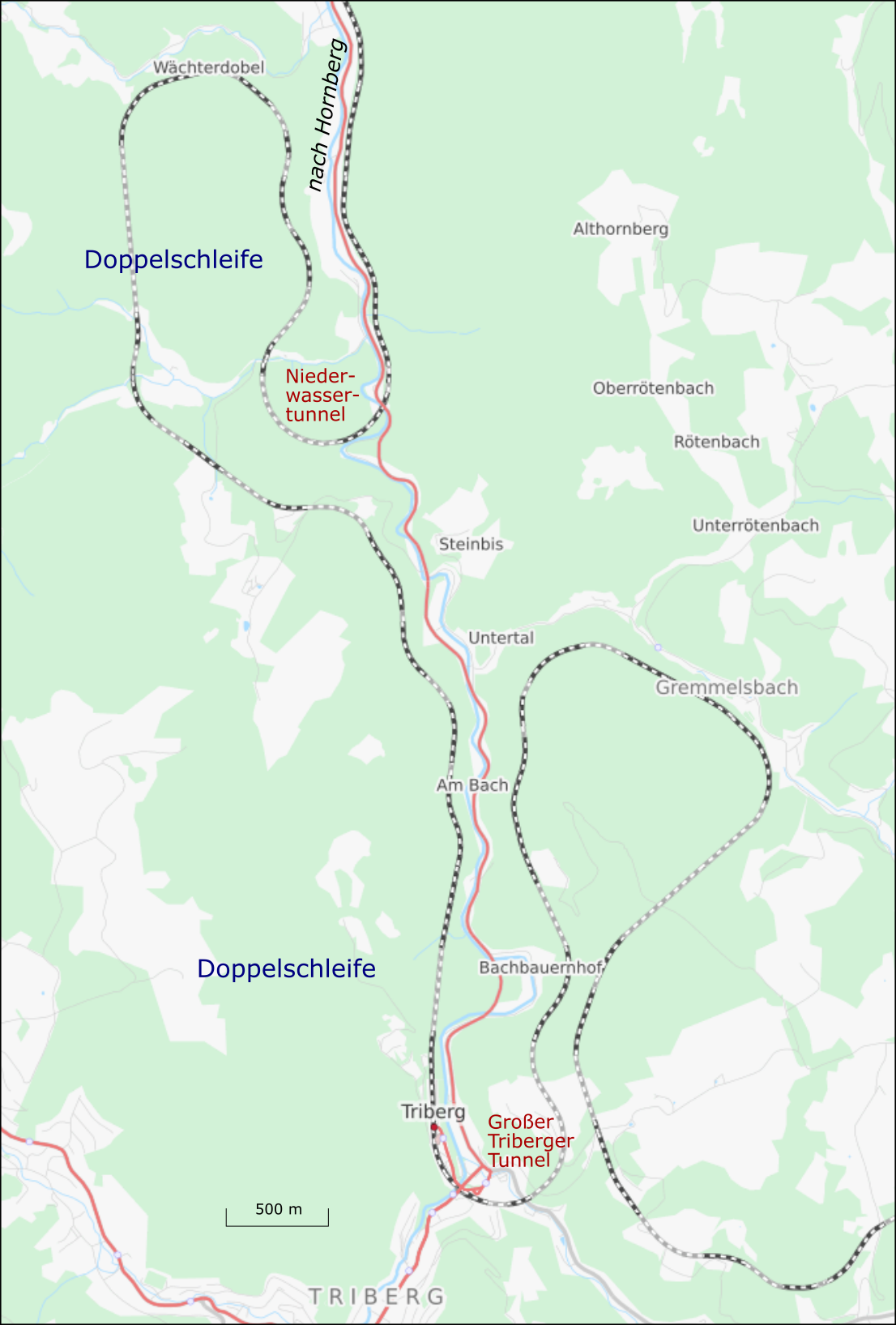
Map of the most challenging section

Since the central section of the line required an extended planning phase, the Baden State Railway made the decision to initially start construction on the first section, from Offenburg to Hausach, and the last section, from Engen to Singen. The work between Offenburg to Hausach turned out to be relatively uncomplicated, since the engineers were able to utilize the Kinzig valley. The only exception was the necessity to create a new river bed for the Kinzig near Gengenbach.

Between Engen and Donaueschingen construction met with considerably more difficult conditions. To deal with the watershed between the Rhine and Danube rivers, the Hattinger tunnel had to be dug through the local limestone. In addition, a 240-metre section of the Danube had to be rerouted between the communities of Pfohren and Neudingen.

Two options were examined to achieve the exit of the Danube valley in the direction of Hegau. One option was to leave the valley near Geisingen, the other choice was to exit near Immendingen. Gerwig chose the latter option, as it turned out to allow for less complex track construction. He chose to artificially lengthen the route with two double slings in the Gutach valley near Triberg. Due to the many tunnels on a curved alignment, the section between Hornberg and Sankt Georgen ended up being the most complicated section of the route, and was completed last.

In 1870, the Franco-Prussian War markedly delayed construction, since the German construction crews were drafted for military service, and the Italian crews were let go. Work did not resume until 1871.

=== 1866-1919 - Operations as part of Baden State Railway ===
The two sections Offenburg–Hausach and Engen–Singen were opened for service in 1866, and the other parts of the line were finished in the next several years. Due to the further delays caused by the Franco-Prussian War in 1870, the Black Forest Railway was not completed in its entirety until 10 November 1873. In addition, the section Singen–Konstanz, which had been opened in 1863 as part of the Baden Mainline, was operationally linked to the Black Forest Railway. Plans were also drawn up to connect the Elz Valley Railway from Freiburg via Elzach with Hausach, but this was never realized.

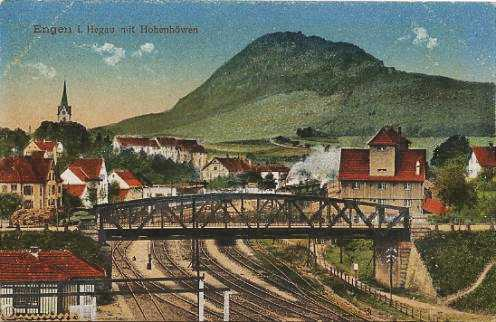
Engen station around 1900

Initially, there were 5 scheduled passenger trains running from Offenburg to Konstanz, and an additional 3 trains were run in the section Villingen–Konstanz. There was also express passenger service from Konstanz to Immendingen, with this train then taking the Gäu Railway to Stuttgart, and one express train from Offenburg to Singen. This last service took about four hours to make that trip. The section Hausach–Villingen was expanded into a twin-track configuration by 1888.

Scheduled passenger train service continually increased through the early 1900s. Additionally, freight train service also saw growth in that same period. Starting in the summer of 1906, more and more passenger express trains utilized the line, amongst them international connections such as Amsterdam–Konstanz, Ostend–Konstanz and Frankfurt am Main–Chur. However, these connections were soon discontinued.

After the start of World War I in 1914, service was steadily decreased for the duration of the war. In the summer of 1918, just a single passenger train frequented the line. Then, on 24 May 1918, a munitions train exploded near Triberg.

=== 1919-1945 - Operations as part of the Deutsche Reichsbahn ===
The sections Offenburg–Hausach and Villingen–Singen were expanded into twin track lines by November 1921, which was made possible by the fact that the rail beds of the entire Black Forest Railway had been laid out to accommodate two tracks. Starting in 1922, the Prussian Class P 8 steam locomotive saw service on the route.

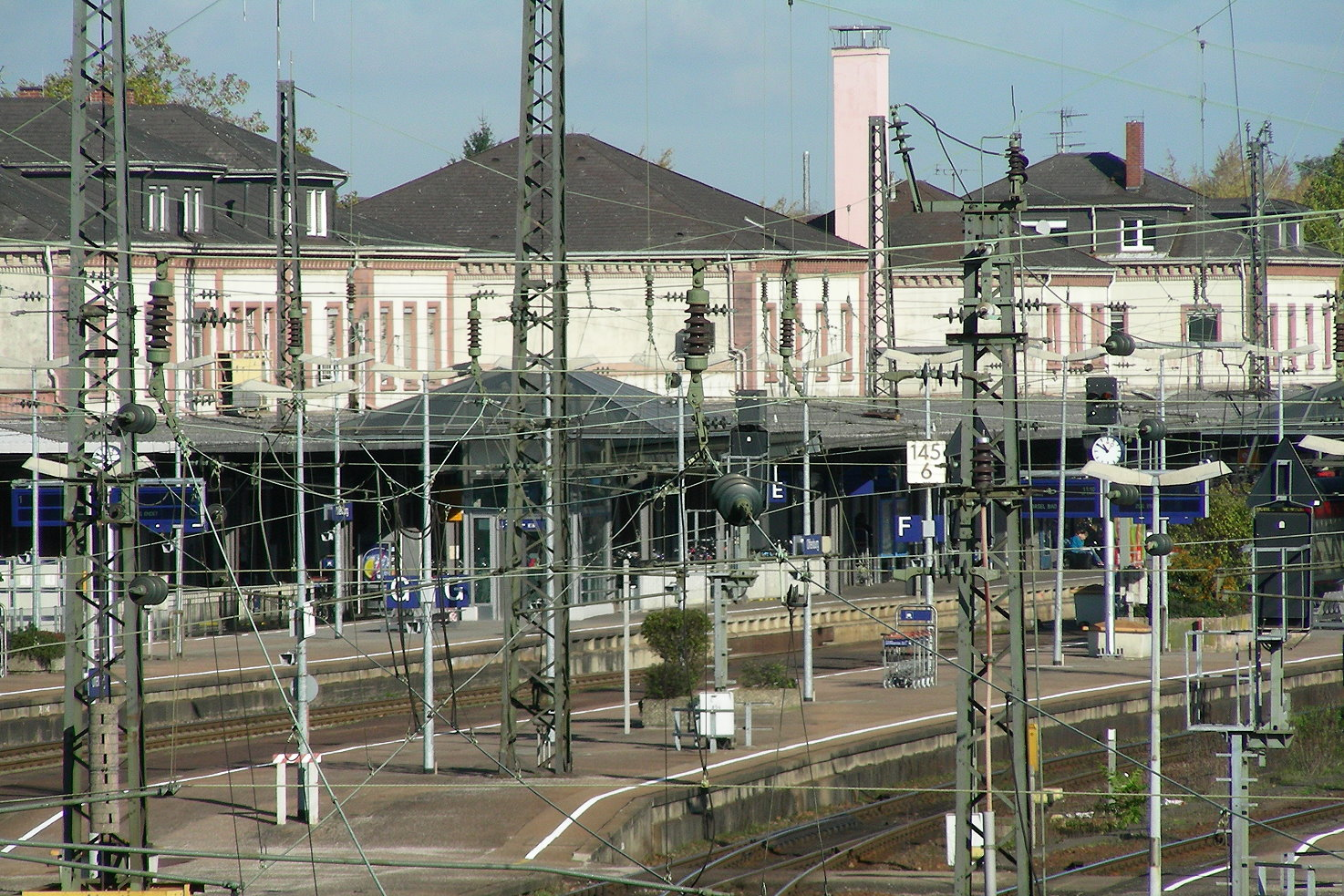
Offenburg station

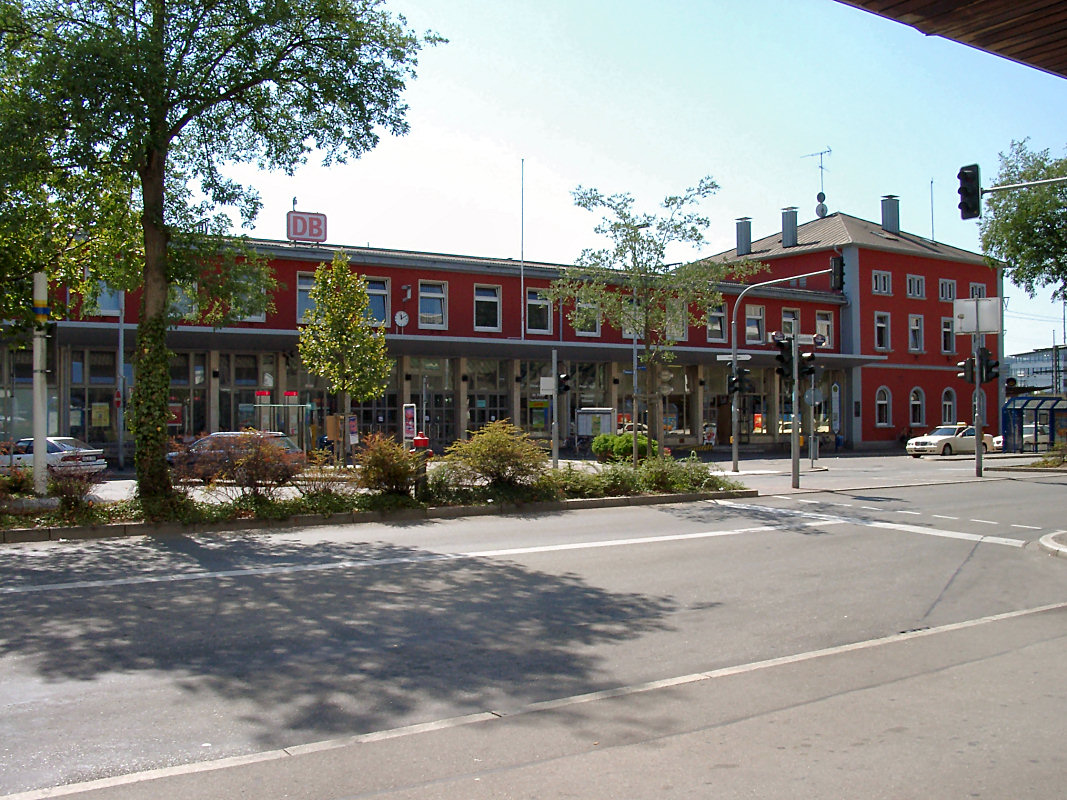
Singen station, the terminus of the Black Forest railway

On 4 February 1923, French troops occupied the towns of Appenweier and Offenburg, which meant that the slow passenger trains (Bummelzug) were forced to start and end their runs in the community of Ortenberg, just south of Offenburg. Only one express passenger train, traveling between Hausach and Konstanz, utilized the line at the time. All the usual through traffic on the Black Forest Railway had to be rerouted in complicated fashion. Only on 11 December 1923, when Appenweier und Offenburg were liberated, did regular service to Offenburg, and limited service further north, resume.

Starting in 1924, the old Hornberg viaduct across the Reichenbach valley was replaced by a new arched bridge to increase the capacity of the route. At the end of October 1925, after 17 months of construction, the new bridge was put into service. Also in 1925 (some sources quote 1931), the 31-metre-long Kaisertunnel was excavated and removed.

On 22 April 1945, service had to be halted when a pillar of the viaduct suffered collateral war damage. The damage was repaired just a few weeks after the end of the war, and the Black Forest Railway was operational again on 30 June 1945.

=== 1945-1994 - Operations as part of the Deutsche Bundesbahn ===
Rail buses were seen on the Black Forest Railway for the first time in the summer of 1955, and the following year marked the first service of diesel locomotives on the line. Diesel locomotives of the type DB Class V 200 replaced the last steam locomotives, particularly of the type DRG Class 39 (former Prussian P 10).

At the start of the 1970s it was decided to electrify the line, in order to make the Black Forest Railway yet more flexible and economically attractive, and on 25 September 1977, the entire line was switched to full electrical operation. The work to electrify the line had been more complex than anticipated, particularly in the many tunnels, as the rail beds had to be lowered in those instances. Several unprofitable railway stations and other halts were also taken out of service at the time. It is also worth noting that, due to the many sections with steep inclines, locomotives of the type DB Class 139, with rheostatic brakes, were prominently seen in service.

1989 saw the beginning of a new chapter in rail service in the Black Forest: The Deutsche Bundesbahn celebrated the creation of a new train type, called InterRegio (IR), with the introduction of new service from Konstanz via Offenburg, Karlsruhe, Heidelberg and Frankfurt am Main to Kassel. These InterRegio trains ran every other hour, alternating on the hour with a Regional-Express (RE) train from Konstanz to Offenburg. InterRegio connections to Berlin, Hamburg, Lübeck, and Stralsund were offered starting in the mid-1990s.

=== 1994 until today - Operations as part of the Deutsche Bahn AG (DB AG) ===
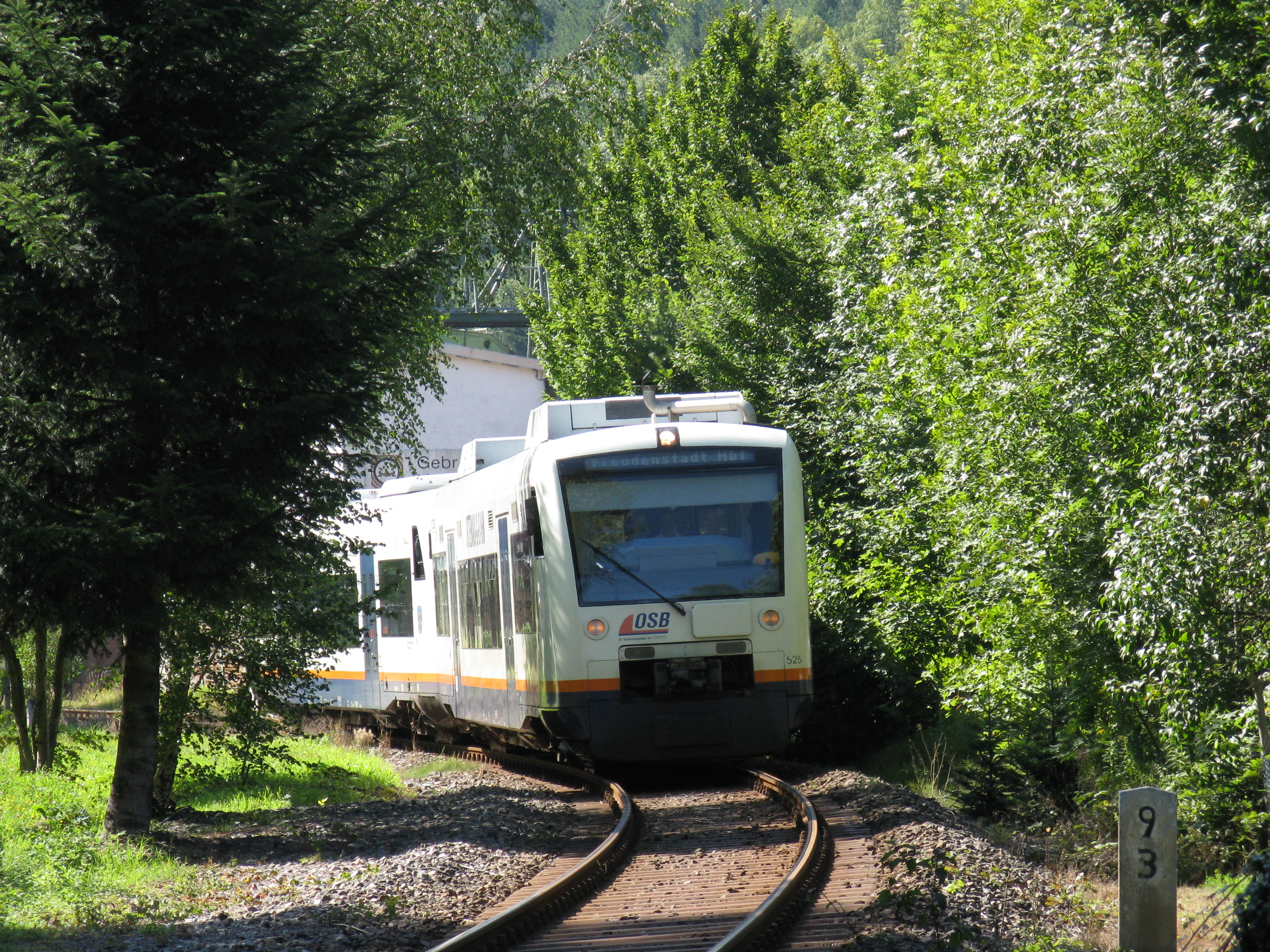
The Ortenau S-Bahn near Halbmeil

The privatization of the Bundesbahn also affected the Black Forest Railway. The rail transport reform program enabled private rail transport companies to gain access to the network of the DB AG, and with it access to the Black Forest Railway. Starting on 24 May 1998, trains of the Ortenau-S-Bahn provided service between Offenburg und Hausach. This service is now available hourly from Offenburg, via Hausach, then onto the Kinzig Valley Railway to Freudenstadt. Concurrently, trains of the Swiss company Mittelthurgaubahn travelled between Engen and Konstanz, which connected via Konstanz into Switzerland.

In 2001, a new halt was constructed at the Offenburg regional vocational school on behalf of the Ortenau S-Bahn. With the new schedule of 2001, and with the exception of two trains, the InterRegio service was replaced by the new Interregio-Express (IRE) trains going from Karlsruhe to Konstanz. The service provided by the RegioExpress trains was also extended to Karlsruhe. At the end of 2002, the two remaining IR trains were converted into Intercity (IC) trains, and the IR train type was discontinued.

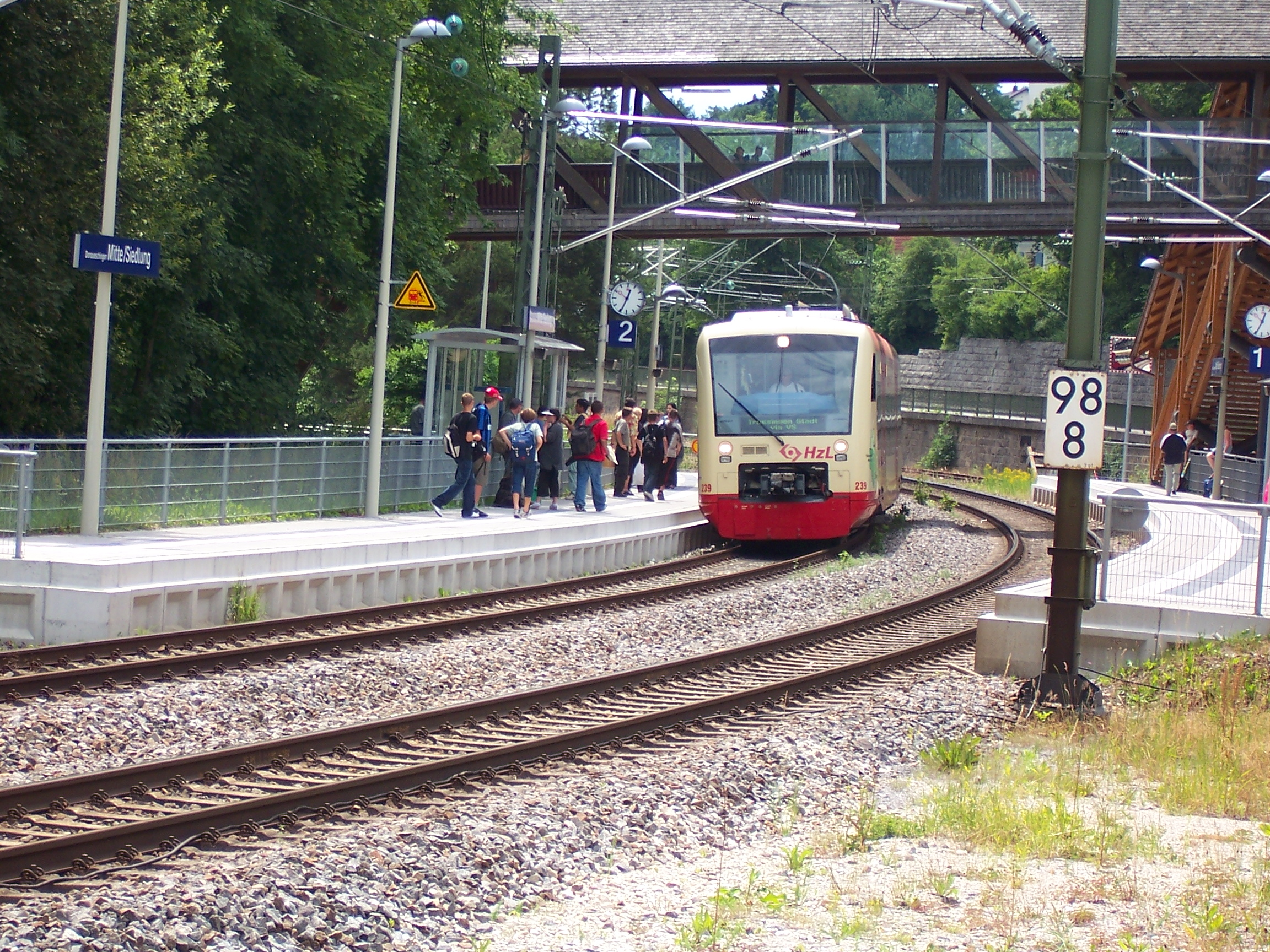
The Ringzug at its halt in Donaueschingen Mitte/Siedlung

Since 2003, sections of the line between Donaueschingen and Villingen, and, since 2004, sections between the Wutach Valley Railway branching near Hintschingen, and Immendingen, are utilized by the Ringzug ('circle train') system of the districts Tuttlingen, Rottweil and Schwarzwald-Baar. For this purpose, several unused halts were reactivated, and new halts were created.

Invitations to bid on providing local rail service between Karlsruhe and Konstanz were issued in 2003 across Europe by the state of Baden-Württemberg. In 2004, the DB Schwarzwaldbahn GmbH, a subsidiary of DB AG, which became part of DB Regio AG before ever starting service, won the contract over two other bidders.

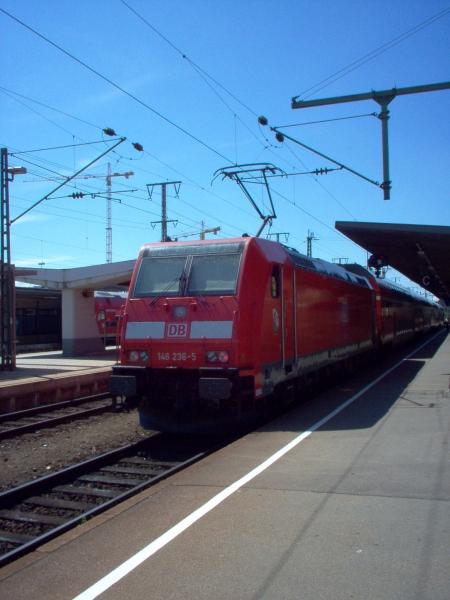
A DBAG Class 146 in Singen

Starting on 10 December 2006, trains consisting of locomotives of the type DBAG Class 146, and modern double-decker passenger cars with the name "Schwarzwaldbahn" printed on them, are providing comfortable service with air conditioning and suspension seats. Passenger counts rose by 30% within a year of starting this service.

The InterCity service 2370/2371, dubbed "Schwarzwald", going from Hamburg to Konstanz, and from Konstanz to Hamburg and Stralsund, still makes this trip daily in parallel with the RegioExpress trains, and replaces that service on the route between Offenburg and Konstanz. On weekends, an additional IC train with numbers 2004 and 2006/2005, dubbed "Bodensee", connects Konstanz with Dortmund, Emden, and Norddeich. Freight traffic is of only secondary significance. In the route table of the DB, the Black Forest Railway is listed under the number 720.

== Route details ==
=== Geography ===
Between Offenburg and Hausach, the Black Forest Railway follows the river Kinzig, and runs right next to it near Gengenbach. The section between Offenburg and Gengenbach is flanked by expansive vineyards, which slowly dwindle away as the Kinzig Valley narrows. The line then runs through the Gutach valley to Hornberg. From Hornberg to Sankt Georgen, the route must negotiate numerous loops, many through tunnels, and transcends several hundred metres in altitude in the process. This section is clearly visible from a lookout point near Triberg.

After passing through Sankt Georgen, the route continues alongside the river Brigach. After Villingen, the route starts to leave the Black Forest behind, and crosses the Baar lowlands. In Donaueschingen, the Black Forest Railway meets up with the Höllental Railway, which is second only to the Black Forest Railway in significance in terms of railways in the area. The route then parallels the Danube river, which is formed by the confluence of the Brigach and Breg rivers, until it reaches Immedingen.

The entire route crosses through four districts of the state of Baden-Württemberg: From Offenburg to Hausach it starts in the Ortenaukreis, and crosses the Schwarzwald-Baar-Kreis between Triberg and Donaueschingen. Kreis Tuttlingen is traversed between Geisingen and Immendingen, and the final part of the line ends up in Kreis Konstanz.

=== Technical characteristics ===
The Black Forest Railway was the first mountain railway to use hair-pin loops, which artificially lengthened the line, but allowed for the grade to stay under 20 per mille at any point. Without this solution, the construction of part of the line as a rack and pinion railway, like the Murg Valley Railway or the Höllental Railway, would have been necessary. Between Hausach and Sankt Georgen, the railway ascends a total of 564 metres. The two towns are separated by only 21 kilometres in a straight line; the railway traverses 38 kilometres to make the trip.

As mentioned before, the line had to be constructed with the limitation that it could not leave the territory of the Grand Duchy of Baden. Building the line via the town of Schramberg, in the Kingdom of Württemberg, would have made construction much less expensive and complex. However, this would have meant that Baden would have had to share control over the strategically important line with another state, and the clock-making industry in Schramberg would have gained an important advantage in their competition with the same industry in Furtwangen in Baden.

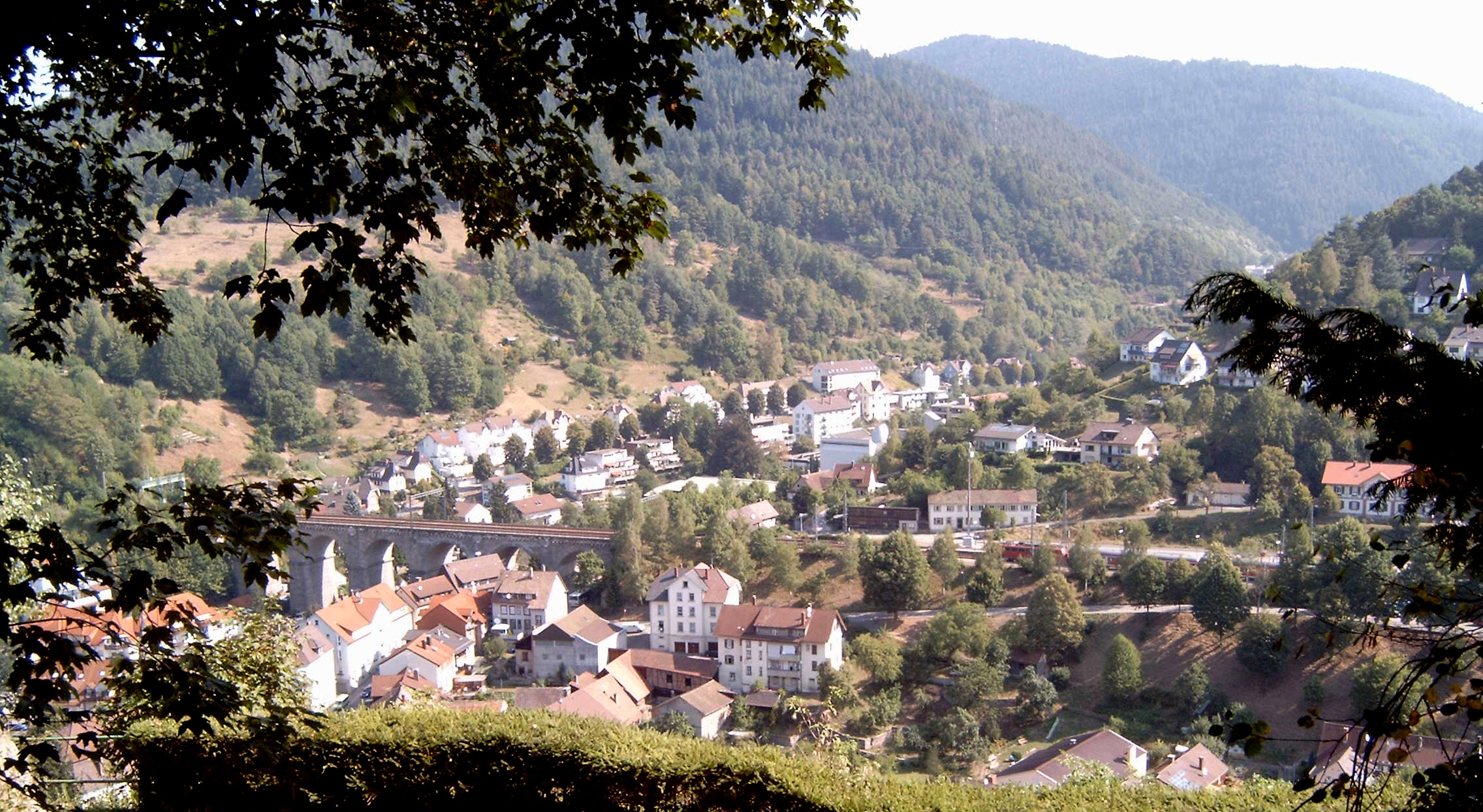
The viaduct in Hornberg

The route passes through numerous tunnels (37 alone in the section between Hausach and Sankt Georgen), but only travels across one large viaduct, in Hornberg. On its way from north to south, the line passes under the main European watershed twice, once via the Sommerau tunnel between Triberg and Sankt Georgen, which is 1,697 metres long, and then via the Hatting tunnel, between Engen and Immendingen, which is 900 metres in length.

Also worth mentioning is the control and safety technology on display on the Black Forest Railway. Three different signal box types are in use: The mechanical type near Villingen, relay-controlled signal boxes near Triberg, and electronic examples near Immendingen.

=== Model railway ===
A part of the Black Forest Railway has been reconstructed, using pictures and actual construction plans, as a model railway in HO scale, in the town of Hausach. With 1,600 metres of track, 1.8 metres from highest to lowest elevation, and an area of 400 square metres, it is the largest model railway project in Europe that replicates an actual railway line.

== See also ==
- History of the railway in Württemberg
