= Kirnach (Brigach) =

River in Germany

Location
- Country: Germany
- State: Baden-Württemberg

Physical characteristics
- Mouth
  - location: Brigach
  - coordinates: 48°04′45″N 8°22′00″E
- Length: 12.4 km (7.7 mi)

Basin features
- Progression: Brigach→ Danube→ Black Sea

Kirnach is a river of Baden-Württemberg, Germany. It is a right tributary of the Brigach near Villingen-Schwenningen. It passes through Unterkirnach.

== See also ==
- List of rivers of Baden-Württemberg
