= Brigach (St. Georgen im Schwarzwald) =

- Village of St. Georgen im Schwarzwald
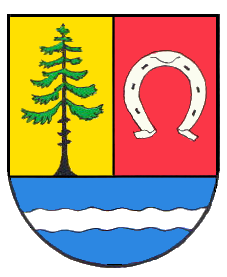
- Coat of arms
- Interactive map of Brigach
- Location within Germany Location within Baden-Württemberg
- Coordinates: 48°06′26″N 08°16′59″E
- Country: Germany
- State: Baden-Württemberg
- Town: St. Georgen im Schwarzwald
- Elevation: 921 m (3,022 ft)

Population (2015-12-31)
  - Total: 910
- Time zone: UTC+01:00 (CET)
  - Summer (DST): UTC+02:00 (CEST)
- Postal codes: 78112
- Dialling codes: 07724

Brigach is a village in the town of Sankt Georgen im Schwarzwald in the district of Schwarzwald-Baar-Kreis in the southwest German state of Baden-Württemberg. It has 910 inhabitants (2015).

== Coat of arms ==
Description: "Über einem blauen Schildfuß mit silbernem Wellenbalken in gespaltenem Schild vorne in Gold eine grüne Tanne mit schwarzem Stamm, hinten in Rot ein silbernes Hufeisen mit nach unten gekehrten Stollen."

== History ==
The first record of Brigach was in 1337 on the occasion of the exchange of serfs between Reichenau Abbey and St. George's. Brigach was named after the Danube tributary and source of Brigach, albeit spelt in a variety of ways such as Brigana, Brigil, Brigene or Briggen. Brigach's history is closely tied to that of Saint George's Abbey. Farms were established very early on in Brigach, that gave a tithe of their harvest and the chickens to the abbey in return for use of the land. In addition the estate owners had to supply socage as well as pay a tax called Hellerzinsen. From 1648 to 1810 Brigach belonged to St. George's Abbey and was thus part of Württemberg. Thereafter is belonged to Hornberg and became part of Baden. From 1857 Brigach came under the Amt of Triberg and, from 1864, the Bezirksamt of Villingen. In 1972 Brigach was incorporated into the town of St. Georgen.

== Administration ==
The civil parish of Brigach, St. Georgen's second largest subdivision, includes the villages of Brigach, Sommerau and Stockwald.

== Literature ==
- Stadt St. Georgen (publ.): Brigach. Hofchronik und Ortsgeschichte, St. Georgen, 1993.
