= Vöhrenbach =

- Town
- Coat of arms

- Location of Vöhrenbach within Schwarzwald-Baar-Kreis district
- Interactive map of Vöhrenbach
- Location within Germany Location within Baden-Württemberg
- Coordinates: 48°02′44″N 08°18′15″E
- Country: Germany
- State: Baden-Württemberg
- Admin. region: Freiburg
- District: Schwarzwald-Baar-Kreis

Government
  - Mayor (2021–29): Heiko Wehrle

Area
  - Total: 70.47 km^{2} (27.21 sq mi)
- Elevation: 797 m (2,615 ft)

Population (2025-12-31)
  - Total: 3,575
  - Density: 50.73/km^{2} (131.4/sq mi)
- Time zone: UTC+01:00 (CET)
  - Summer (DST): UTC+02:00 (CEST)
- Postal codes: 78147
- Dialling codes: 07727
- Vehicle registration: VS
- Website: www.voehrenbach.de

Vöhrenbach (German pronunciation: [ˈføːʁənbax]) is a town in the district of Schwarzwald-Baar, in Baden-Württemberg, Germany. It is situated on the river Breg, 12 km west of Villingen-Schwenningen.

== Geography ==
The town of Vöhrenbach lies in the Breg valley in the central Black Forest between Furtwangen and Villingen-Schwenningen. The land belonging to the town is heavily forested, comprising 77% of the total area.

=== Neighboring communities ===
The town borders St. Georgen im Schwarzwald to the north; Villingen-Schwenningen, Unterkirnach and Donaueschingen to the east; Bräunlingen and Eisenbach in the south; Titisee-Neustadt to the southwest; and Furtwangen to the west. With the exception of Eisenbach and Titisee-Neustadt (Landkreis Breisgau-Hochschwarzwald), all neighboring communities belong to the district Schwarzwald-Baar-Kreis.

=== Town structure ===
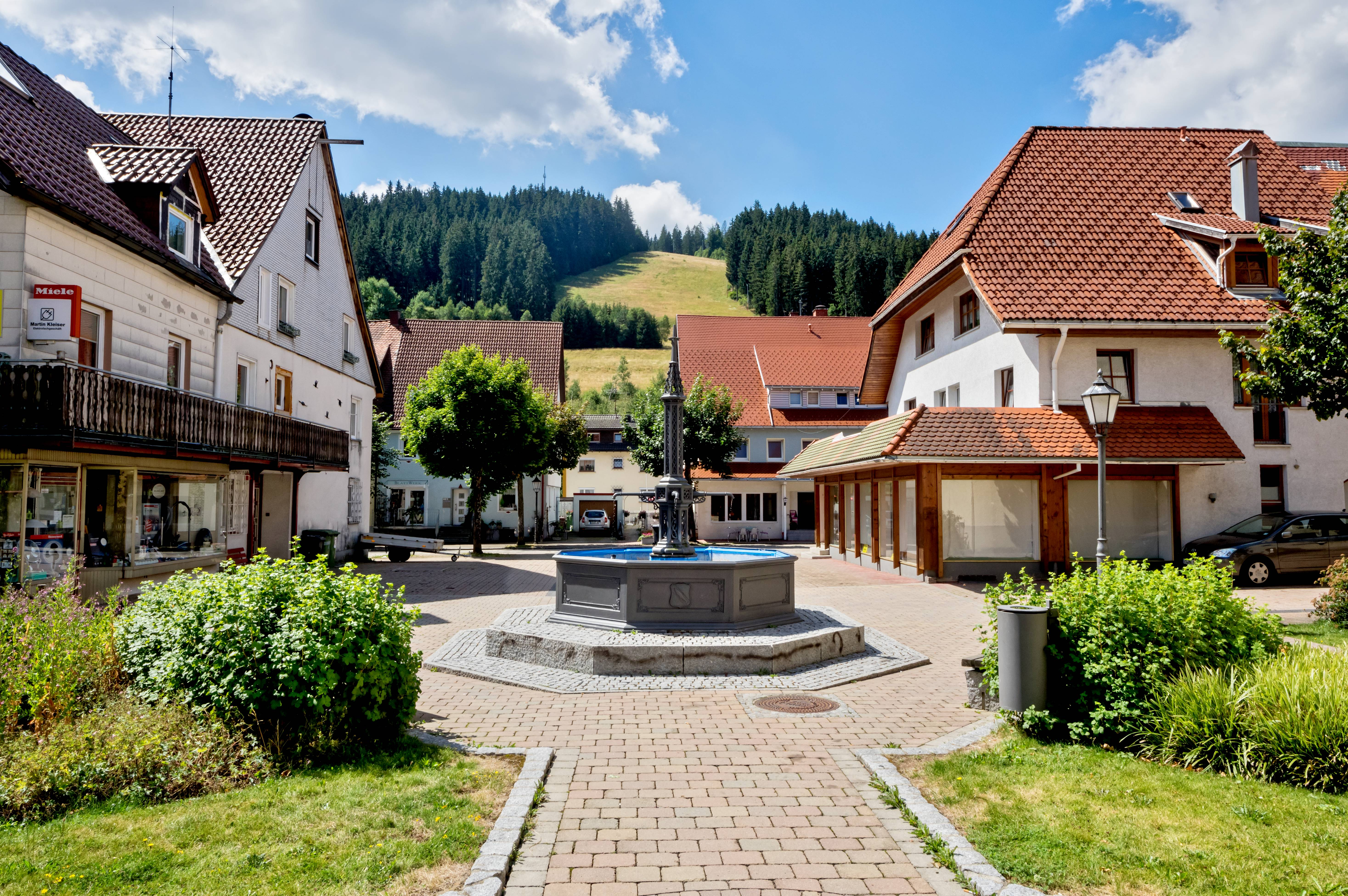
Vöhrenbach

The town of Vöhrenbach consists of Vöhrenbach (which includes the town with its older borders from before 1971) and the three Stadtteile (quarters) of Hammereisenbach-Bregenbach, Langenbach und Urach in addition to 89 further villages, hamlets, farms and homes. In the course of the municipal reforms in Baden-Württemberg, Vöhrenbach grew to include Hammereisenbach-Bregenbach on 1 July 1971 and then Langenbach as well as Urach on 1 December 1971. The districts now belonging to the town Vöhrenbach are territorially identical to the formally independent municipalities of the same name. The town center (Vöhrenbach) and the three districts (Hammereisenbach-Bregenbach, Langenbach and Urach) are local communities in their own right, each having a local chairman.

== History ==
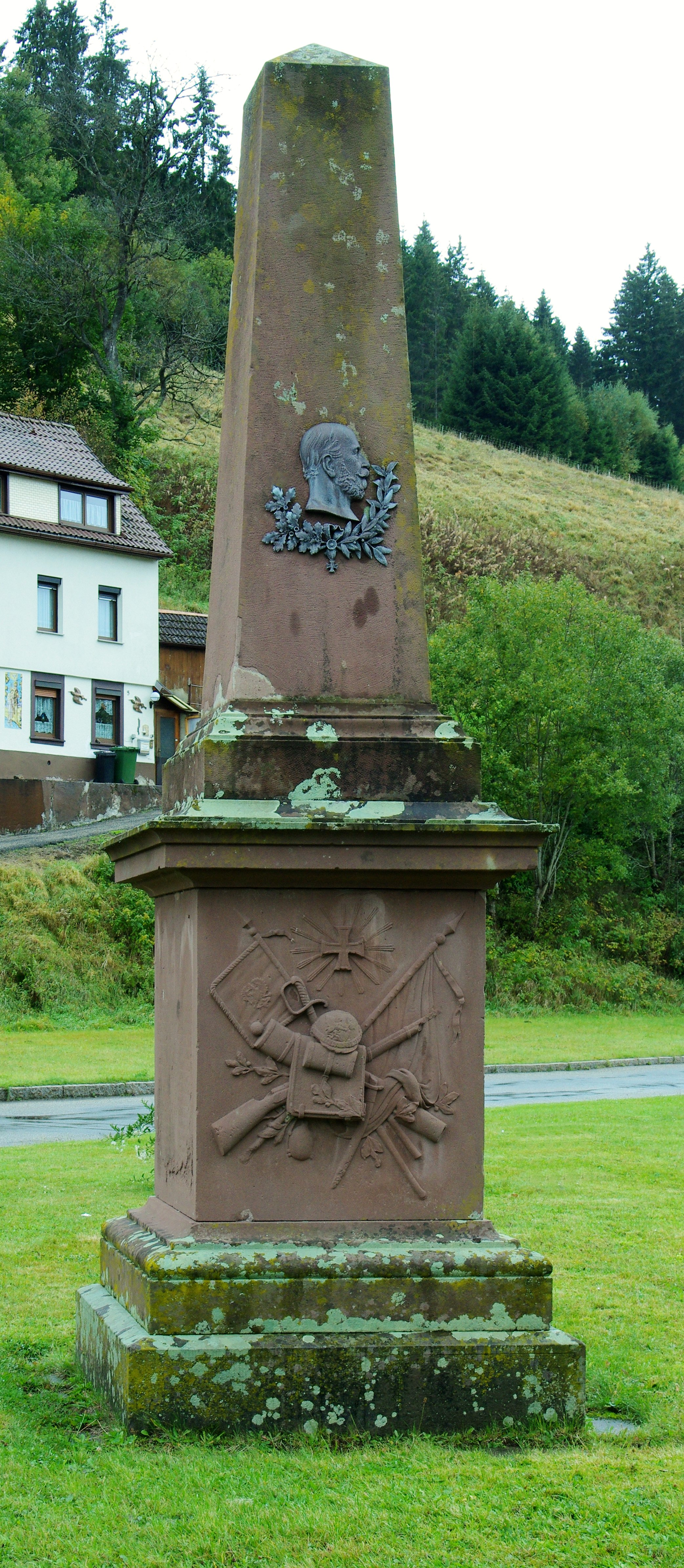
War memorial

Vöhrenbach received a town charter in 1244 from the Counts of Urach as competition to Villingen. However, the town never reached the importance of Villingen. In 1806, the city became part of the newly founded Grand Duchy of Baden.

== Politics ==
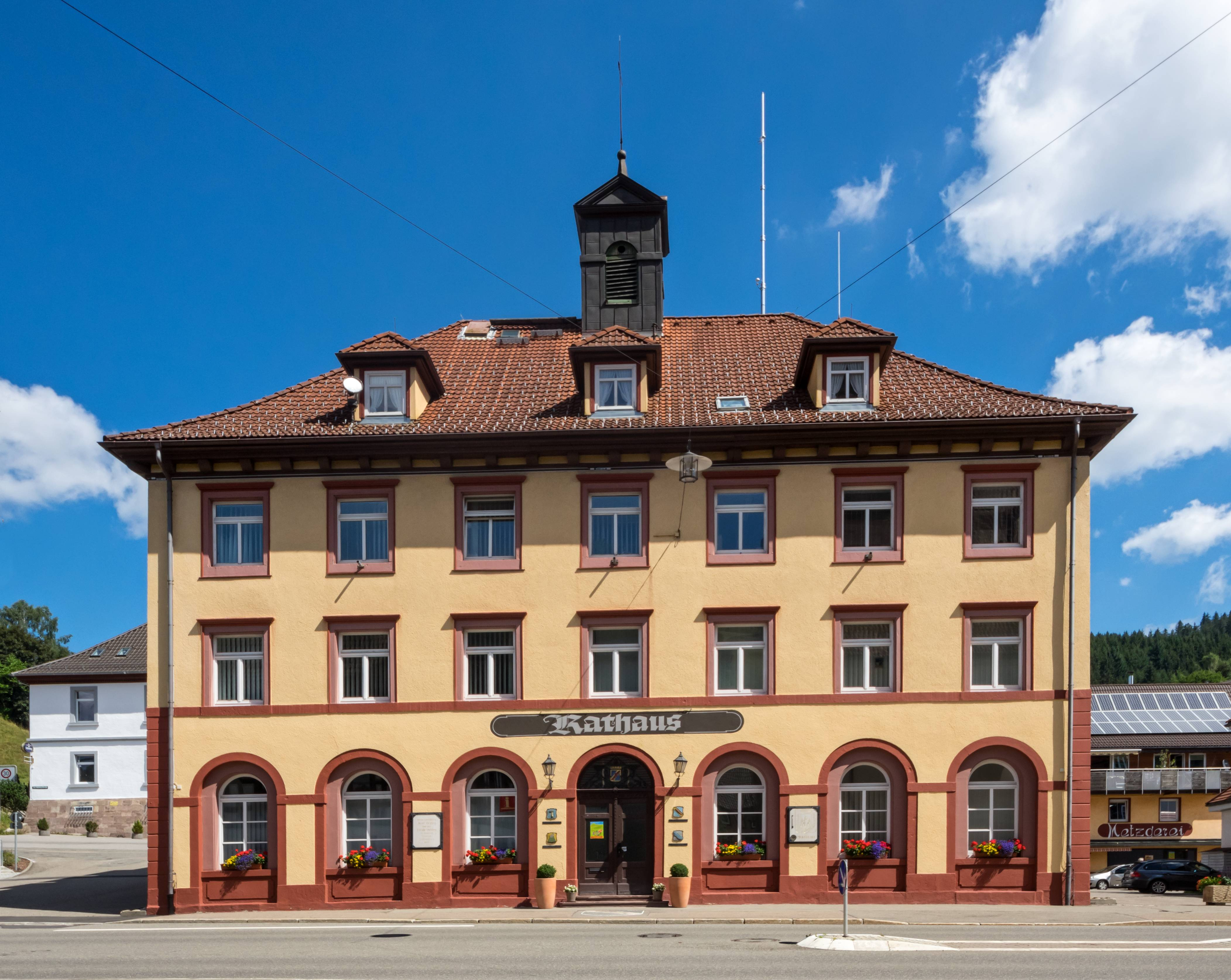
Town hall

=== Local council ===
The municipal council of Vöhrenbach has 14 members. The municipal council consists of the elected municipal councilmen and the mayor as chairman. The mayor is entitled to vote in the municipal council. The municipal election of 25 Mai 2014 resulted in 49.1% turnout (2009: 52.4%) with the following results:

CDU	9 seats	66.9%	2009: 40.4%, 6 seats
Bürger- und Wählervereinigung (BWV) (de)	5 seats	33.1%	2009: 25.0%, 3 seats
SPD	0 seats	0.0%	2009: 34.6%, 5 seats

=== Mayors ===
According to the legend of the Seven Virgins, it is not possible in Vöhrenbach to re-elect a mayor. Mayors Sorg, Neininger and Wolf were all voted out of office after their first term. In 1981, Karl-Heinz Schneider first succeeded in being re-elected. Karl-Heinz Schneider lost the election for a fourth term in 1997 to Robert Strumberger. Robert Strumberger has now been re-elected twice.

- 1813–1821: Joseph Merz
- ....
- 1918–1931: Karl Kraut
- 1939–1941: Paul Siedle
- 1941–1945: Fritz Dold
- 1945: Karl Faller
- 1946: Bernhard Wiedemann
- 1946: Egon Hettich
- 1946–1957: Ernst Sorg
- 1957–1964: Friedrich Neininger (1957–1971 Mayor of Langenbach, 1971–1977 local chairman of Langenbach)
- 1964–1972: Heinrich Wolff
- 1972–1997: Karl-Heinz Schneider
- 1997–2021: Robert Strumberger
- 2021– : Heiko Wehrle

=== Coat of arms ===
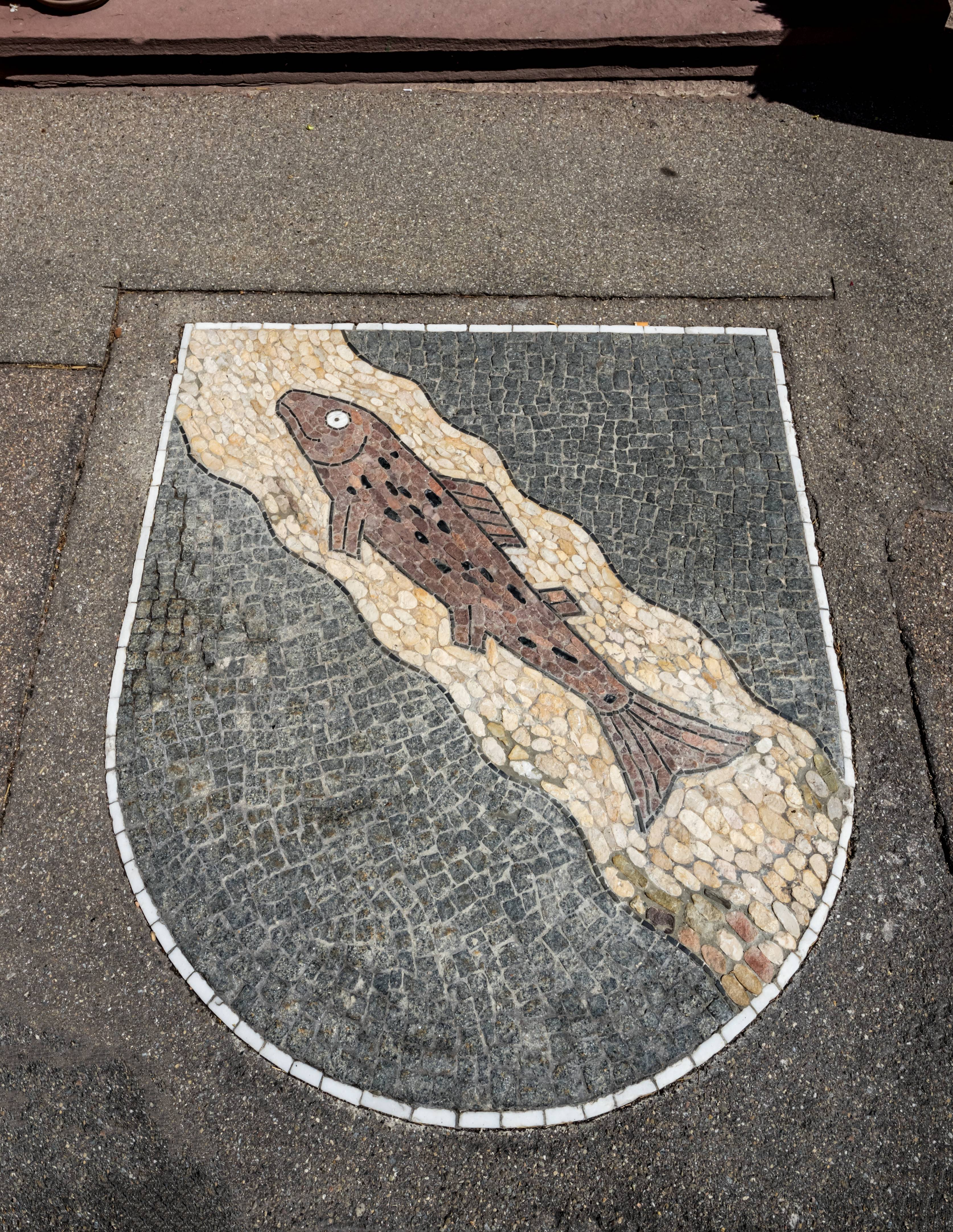
Coat of arms in front of the town hall

The blazon of the coat of arms reads: "In blue, a golden oblique wave beam, within it a red trout swimming upwards."

=== Coat of arms of the districts ===
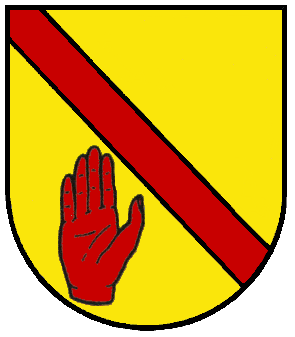
Bregenbach

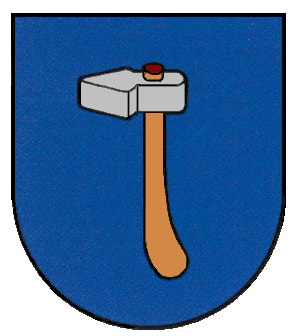
Hammer-
eisenbach

Langenbach

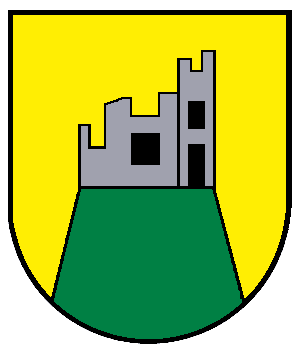
Urach

=== Partner town ===
Vöhrenbach has been twinned with the French commune Morteau in Franche-Comté since 1973.

== Culture and sights ==
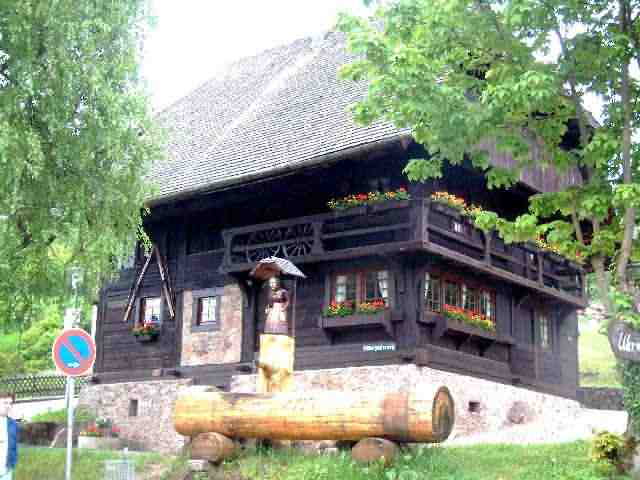
The Uhrmacherhäusle in Vöhrenbach

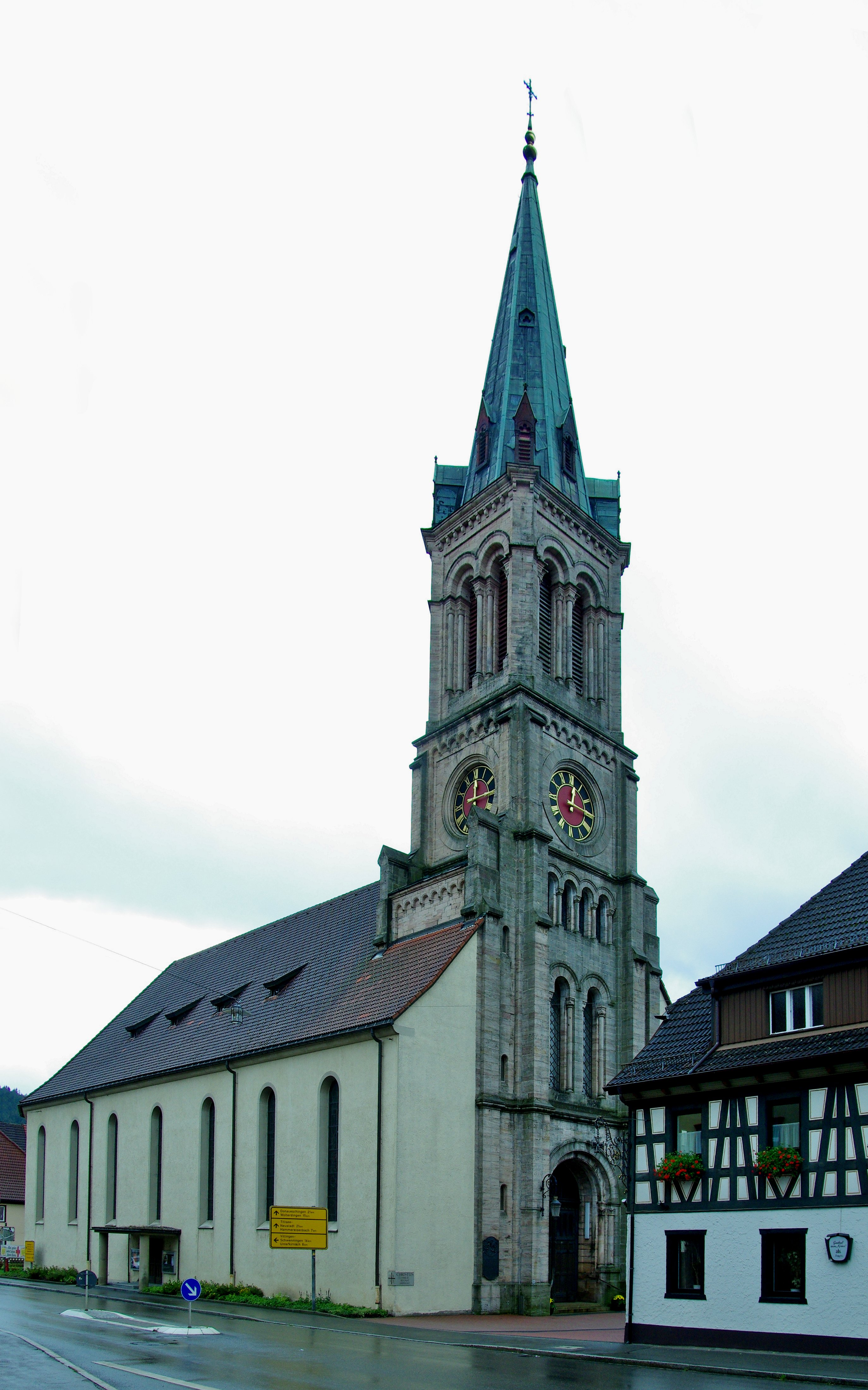
Parish church St. Martin

As it is home to a historical clock making region of the Black Forest (see cuckoo clock), Vöhrenbach is on the German Clock Road.

=== Buildings and monuments ===
- The dam Linachtalsperre (de) is a listed structure of historical importance. This dam and hydroelectric power station, which had been shut down for years, was reactivated on 16 March 2007. The renewable energy power plant is expected to generate 1.2 million kilowatt hours. In addition, the Linach Reservoir is to become a tourist attraction in the future.
- The Catholic parish church St. Martin (de), newly constructed in 1953–54 and integrated in the tower build 1871–73, contains sculptures from two members of the Vöhrenbacher sculptor family Winterhalder, Adam Winterhalder (de) and Johann Michael Winterhalder.
- The Catholic parish church Allerheiligen (de) in the district of Urach dates from the 11th to the 18th century and contains works by Matthias Faller (de).
- The Uhrmacherhäusle (clockmaker's house) from 1726 war recently renovated.
- The Bruderkirchle or Michaelskapelle: The chapel on the old road from Vöhrenbach to Villingen via Herzogenweiler was first mentioned in 1580.
- Ruins of the castles Neu-Fürstenberg (de) and Krumpenschloss (de) are located in the district Hammereisenbach-Bregenbach.

=== Sport ===
The Black Forest Bike Marathon, held annually since 1997 leads through Vöhrenbach.

The soccer team FC Vöhrenbach 1926 plays in the Kreisliga.

== Economy and infrastructure ==
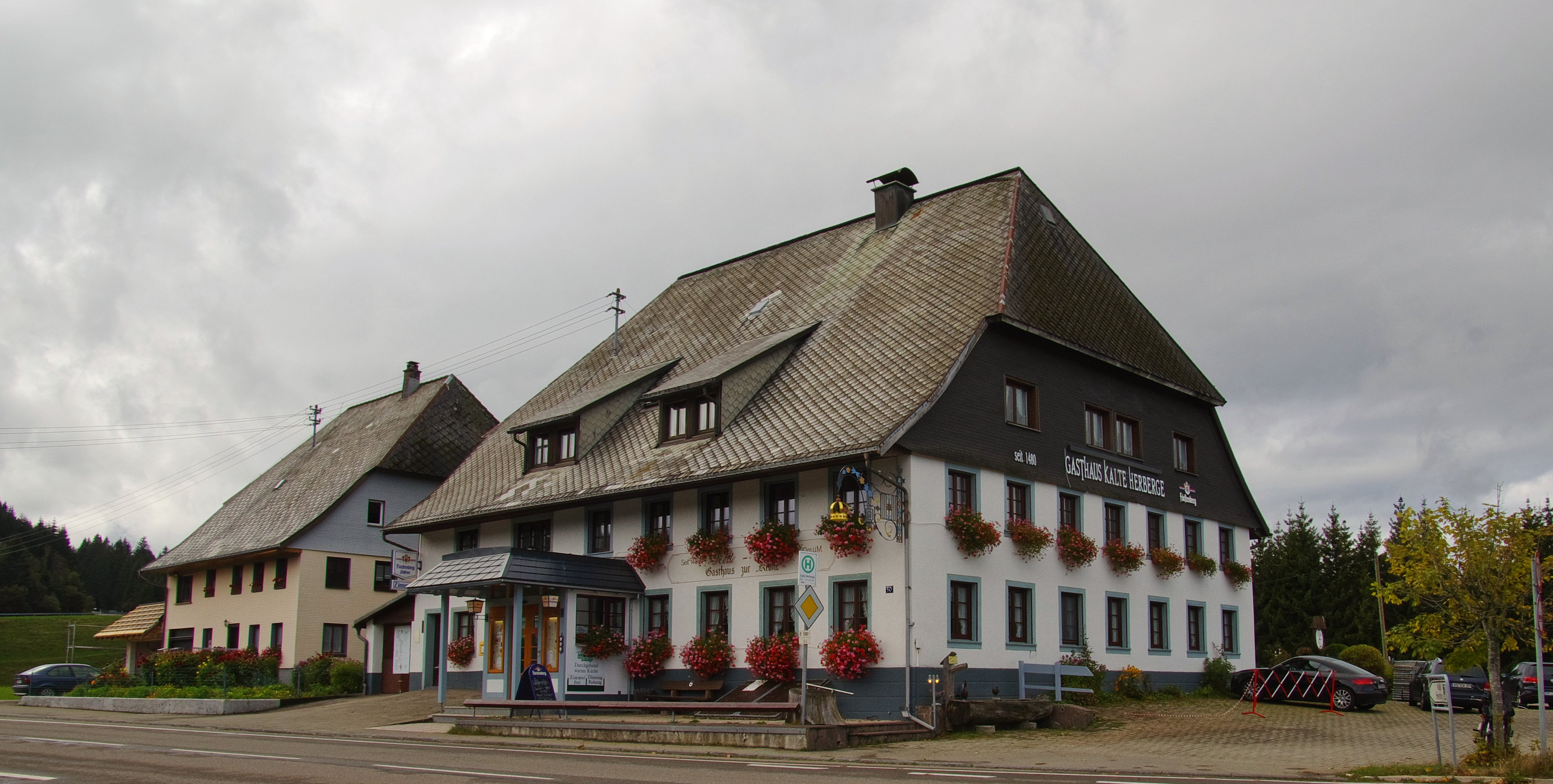
The inn Kalte Herberge

The town's economy is characterized by medium-sized industry, handicrafts, commerce and tourism. Agriculture plays a major role in the districts and villages. Vöhrenbach is economically strongly connected with neighboring Furtwangen.

=== Traffic ===
The connections to Furtwangen and Villingen are via L 173. L 172 offers a connection to Titisee-Neustadt and via L 180 to Donaueschingen. A 81, east of Villingen-Schwenningen is the closest highway (Autobahn).

Until 1972, Vöhrenbach was also served by the train Bregtalbahn (de), which ran between Donaueschingen and Furtwangen. The western section from Bräunlingen to Furtwangen was turned into a bicycle path after its closure.

=== Education ===
In Vöhrenbach, there was the elementary and secondary school Josef-Hebting-Schule. The schools were though reorganized and this merged with secondary schools in Unterkirnach und Eisenbach (Hochschwarzwald). The Josef-Hebting-Schule is now a primary school and Werkrealschule with branches in Unterkirnach und Eisenbach. The municipal council of Eisenbach decided on 8 May 2014 to cancel this agreement by Summer 2016. All secondary schools are located in Furtwangen. There are also two Roman Catholic Kindergartens. The university of applied science Hochschule Furtwangen University is located in neighboring Furtwangen, providing an offer of higher education.

== Notable people ==
- Josef Winterhalder the Elder (1702–1769), sculptor
- Johann Michael Winterhalder (1706–1759), sculptor
- Josef Winterhalder the Younger (1743–1807), painter
