= Tuningen =

- Municipality
- Coat of arms

- Location of Tuningen within Schwarzwald-Baar-Kreis district
- Interactive map of Tuningen
- Location within Germany Location within Baden-Württemberg
- Coordinates: 48°01′36″N 8°36′07″E
- Country: Germany
- State: Baden-Württemberg
- Admin. region: Freiburg
- District: Schwarzwald-Baar-Kreis

Government
  - Mayor (2019–27): Ralf Pahlow

Area
  - Total: 15.59 km^{2} (6.02 sq mi)
- Elevation: 743 m (2,438 ft)

Population (2025-12-31)
  - Total: 3,232
  - Density: 207.3/km^{2} (536.9/sq mi)
- Time zone: UTC+01:00 (CET)
  - Summer (DST): UTC+02:00 (CEST)
- Postal codes: 78609
- Dialling codes: 07464
- Vehicle registration: VS
- Website: www.tuningen.de

Tuningen (German pronunciation: [ˈtuːnɪŋən]) is a municipality located in the Schwarzwald-Baar district in the middle of Baden-Württemberg, Germany.

The municipality belongs to the administrative authority (Verwaltungsgemeinschaft) of Villingen-Schwenningen.

== Geography ==
Tuningen is located at the east border of the Black Forest about 14 km south-east of the district town Villingen-Schwenningen, 6 km east of Bad Dürrheim and 5 km south-west of Trossingen.

== History ==
The first explicit reference to Tuningen dates to 797, in a deed of donation by the cloister St. Gallen.

== Twin towns ==
- Camogli, Italy, since 1998
