= Granegg Castle (Niedereschach) =

Former castle in Baden-Württemberg, Germany

- Schloss Graneck
- Interactive map of the Granegg Castle area

General information
- Location: Niedereschach, Germany
- Coordinates: 48.141°N 8.494°E

Granegg Castle (German: Schloss Graneck) is a lost castle that stood in the parish of the present day municipality of Niedereschach. Graneck is believed to have stood on the mountain between the independent parishes of Fischbach and Schabenhausen.

== History ==
In 1281 a Bruno of Graneck is mentioned for the first time. Following its acquisition by the Ifflingers in 1465, this ambitious noble family named itself after the castle. In 1778 the parish acquired the castle and its associated estates, whereupon it was demolished apart from a part of the domestic buildings.

== Status ==
Today there is only one building left, the Schlosshof. The German foundation Deutsche Stiftung Denkmalschutz (DSD) supported the restoration with €80.000.
