= Hüfingen =

- Town
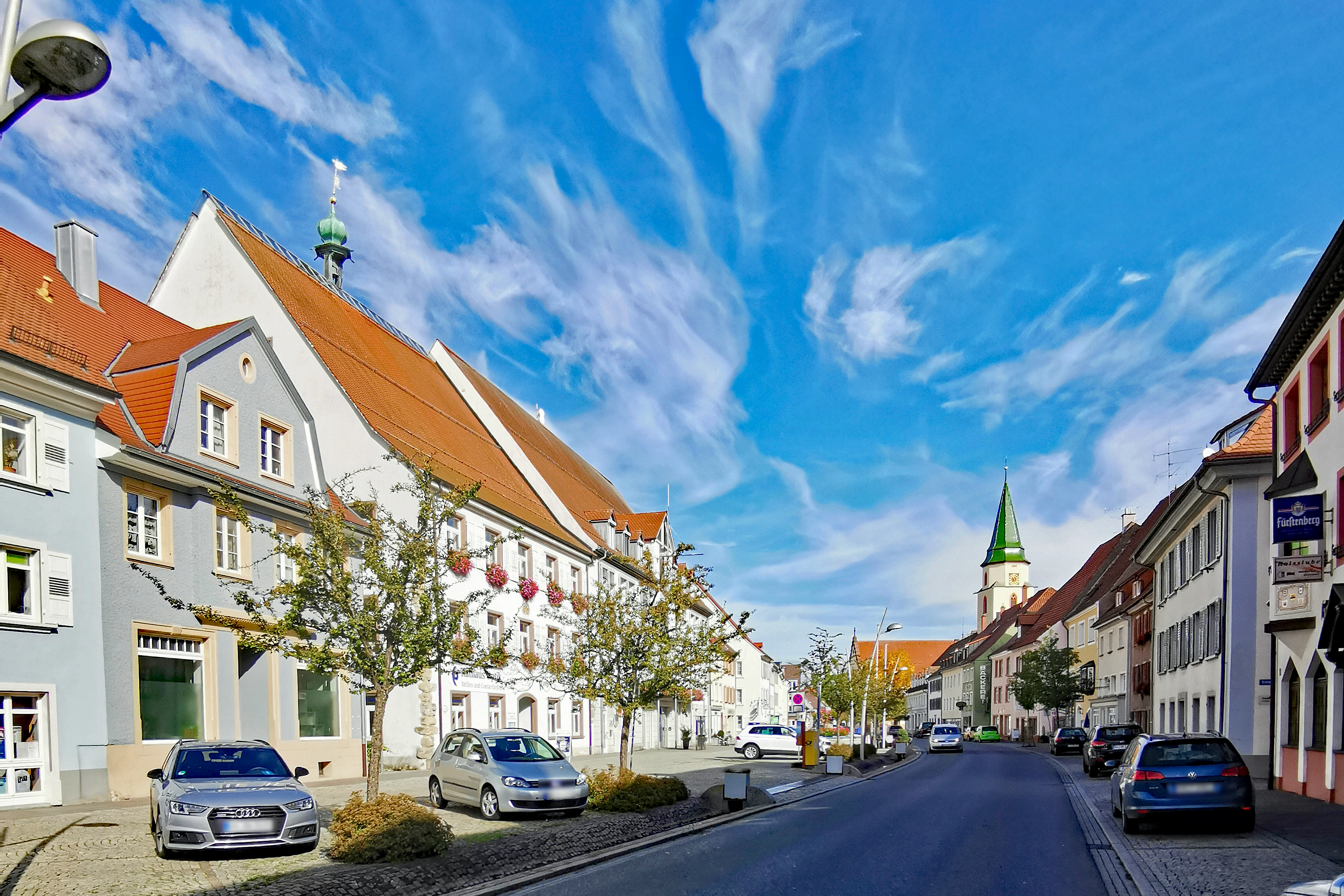
- Hüfingen

- Coat of arms

- Location of Hüfingen within Schwarzwald-Baar-Kreis district
- Interactive map of Hüfingen
- Location within Germany Location within Baden-Württemberg
- Coordinates: 47°55′34″N 08°29′24″E
- Country: Germany
- State: Baden-Württemberg
- Admin. region: Freiburg
- District: Schwarzwald-Baar-Kreis
- Subdivisions: 6 Stadtteile

Government
  - Mayor (2017–25): Michael Kollmeier (CDU)

Area
  - Total: 58.55 km^{2} (22.61 sq mi)
- Elevation: 684 m (2,244 ft)

Population (2025-12-31)
  - Total: 8,048
  - Density: 137.5/km^{2} (356.0/sq mi)
- Time zone: UTC+01:00 (CET)
  - Summer (DST): UTC+02:00 (CEST)
- Postal codes: 78183
- Dialling codes: 0771
- Vehicle registration: VS
- Website: www.huefingen.de

Hüfingen (German pronunciation: [ˈhyːfɪŋən]; Low Alemannic: Hifinge) is a town in the district of Schwarzwald-Baar, in Baden-Württemberg, Germany. It is situated on the river Breg, 4 km south of the source of the Danube.

== History ==
Hüfingen has the historical distinction of once marking the boundary of the Roman empire. In the first century of the common era, imperial policy settled on using the natural boundaries formed by the Danube and the Rhine rivers. Because of its proximity to the source of the Danube in nearby Donaueschingen, Hüfingen was the site of a Roman fort, Brigobanne, built to implement this policy. The legions built a road to Hüfingen from what is now Schleitheim, on the upper Rhine in Switzerland, thus connecting the two rivers with a man-made line on the landscape, defining a continuous border.

== Geography ==
=== Location ===
The city is situated at around 750 meters above sea level on the Baar plateau on the eastern edge of the southern Black Forest in the valley of Breg, about four kilometers south of Donaueschingen.

=== Nearby towns ===
To the north of the town is Donaueschingen, to the east is the town Geisingen in the district of Tuttlingen, to the south the town borders on Blumberg, and to the west is the town of Bräunlingen.
