= Mönchweiler =

- Municipality
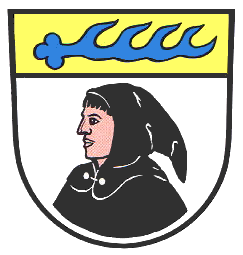
- Coat of arms

- Location of Mönchweiler within Schwarzwald-Baar-Kreis district
- Interactive map of Mönchweiler
- Location within Germany Location within Baden-Württemberg
- Coordinates: 48°06′00″N 08°25′28″E
- Country: Germany
- State: Baden-Württemberg
- Admin. region: Freiburg
- District: Schwarzwald-Baar-Kreis

Government
  - Mayor (2024–32): Rudolf Fluck

Area
  - Total: 9.6 km^{2} (3.7 sq mi)
- Elevation: 757 m (2,484 ft)

Population (2025-12-31)
  - Total: 2,736
  - Density: 280/km^{2} (740/sq mi)
- Time zone: UTC+01:00 (CET)
  - Summer (DST): UTC+02:00 (CEST)
- Postal codes: 78087
- Dialling codes: 07721
- Vehicle registration: VS
- Website: moenchweiler.de

Mönchweiler (German pronunciation: [ˈmœnçvaɪlɐ]) is a municipality in the district of Schwarzwald-Baar in Baden-Württemberg in Germany.

== Demographics ==
Population development:

Year	Inhabitants
1990	2.994
2001	3,176
2011	3,024
2021	2,964
