= Dauchingen =

German municipality

- Municipality
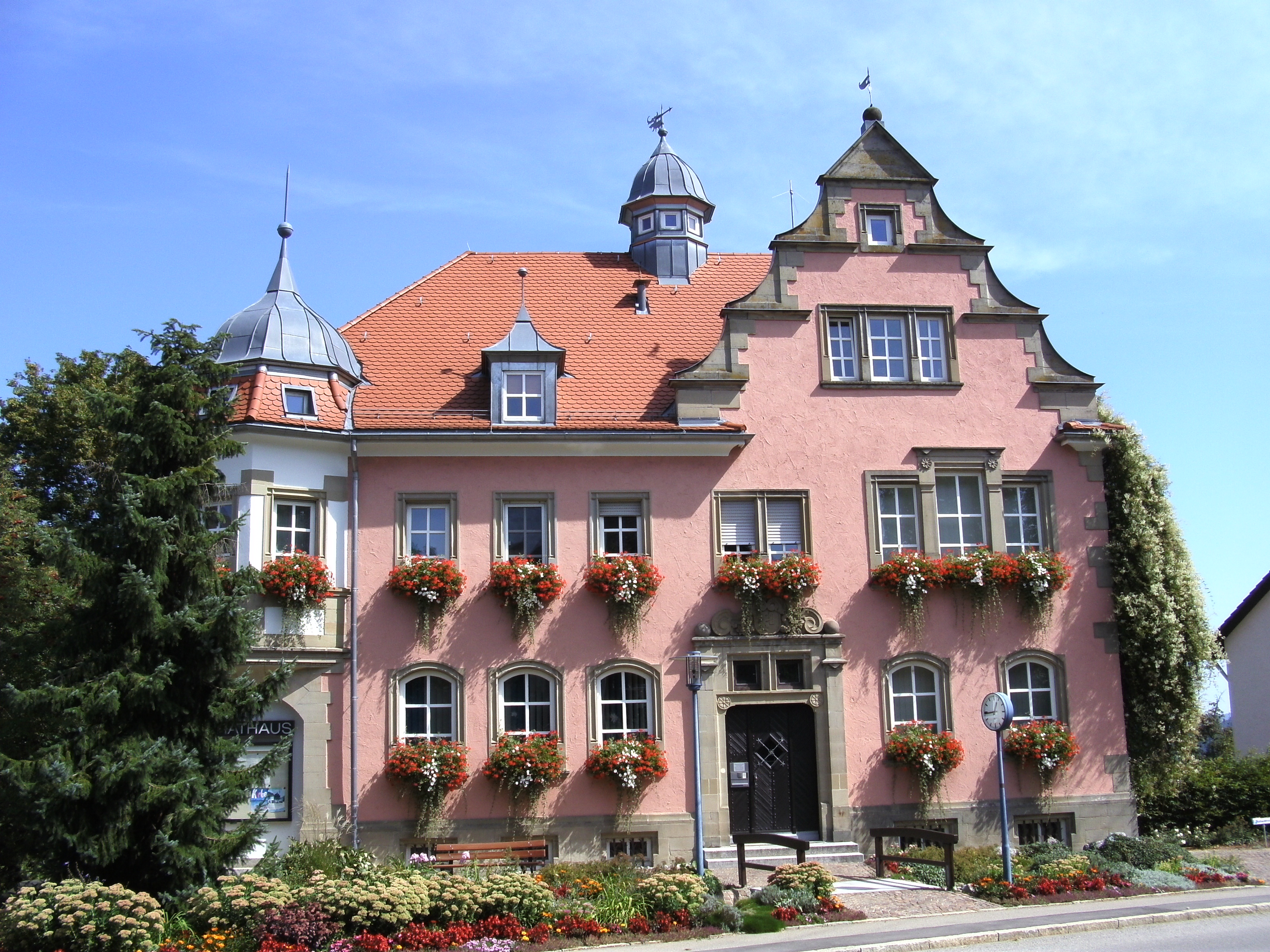
- Dauchingen town hall

- Coat of arms

- Location of Dauchingen within Schwarzwald-Baar-Kreis district
- Interactive map of Dauchingen
- Location within Germany Location within Baden-Württemberg
- Coordinates: 48°05′25″N 08°33′07″E
- Country: Germany
- State: Baden-Württemberg
- Admin. region: Freiburg
- District: Schwarzwald-Baar-Kreis

Area
  - Total: 10.03 km^{2} (3.87 sq mi)
- Elevation: 732 m (2,402 ft)

Population (2025-12-31)
  - Total: 3,807
  - Density: 379.6/km^{2} (983.1/sq mi)
- Time zone: UTC+01:00 (CET)
  - Summer (DST): UTC+02:00 (CEST)
- Postal codes: 78083
- Dialling codes: 07720
- Vehicle registration: VS
- Website: www.dauchingen.de

Dauchingen (German pronunciation: [ˈdaʊxɪŋən]; Low Alemannic: Dauchinge) is a municipality in the district of Schwarzwald-Baar in Baden-Württemberg, Germany.

== History ==
Some of the earliest evidence of human habitation of the area of Dauchingen are Roman and suggest a villa rustica from between the years 88 to 138 AD. The first settlements in the area however are Alemanni and dates to 270 AD. The first documentation of a settlement at Dauchingen comes from 1092 and refers to it "Tuchingen", a property of St. George's Abbey in the Black Forest. Ownership of Dauchingen passed to the Duchy of Zähringen, whose ruling house went extinct in 1218, and then to the County of Urach, and then to County of Fürstenberg. In 1405, the Fürstenbergs renounced their claim to Dauchingen in favor of the County of Zollern. The town was sold in 1479 by Gregor von Roggwil of Constance to the Free Imperial City of Rottweil.

In 1803, Rottweil was mediatized to the Electorate of Württemberg, and Dauchingen thus became a possession of Württemberg. The town was assigned in 1806 or 1808 to Oberamt Rottweil. In October 1810, the now Kingdom of Württemberg ceded Dauchingen to the Grand Duchy of Baden per the Baden-Württemberg Border Treaty of 1810. Dauchingen was assigned to the district of Villingen. As part of the 1973 Baden-Württemberg district reform, that district was dissolved and replaced with the new Schwarzwald-Baar district, to which Dauchingen was assigned. The town of Dauchingen began a steady spread to the south in the latter half of the 1970s.

== Geography ==
Dauchingen is a municipality (Gemeinde) of the Schwarzwald-Baar district of Baden-Württemberg, one of the 16 states of the Federal Republic of Germany. The municipality lies at the northern edge of the district, along its border with the district of Rottweil. Inside Schwarzwald-Baar, Dauchingen borders Villingen-Schwenningen. Dauchingen is physically located in the Baar region. Elevation above sea level in the municipal area ranges from a high of 764 meters (2,507 ft) Normalnull (NN) to a low of 624 meters (2,047 ft) NN.

== Coat of arms ==
The coat of arms for Dauchingen displays a lion in yellow, facing to the right and holding a white plowshare in its forepaws, upon a field of red. This pattern was derived from a town seal used in 1807 that showed the Zähringen Lion, holding the letter "D" in its paws. The present coat of arms was designed by the Karlsruhe General State Archives in 1902, but it was not selected by the municipal council until after 1945. The coat of arms received approval for official use by the Federal Ministry of the Interior, which also issued an accompanying flag, on 18 August 1961.

== Transportation ==
Dauchingen is connected to Germany's network of roadways by the Bundesstraße 27 and Bundesstraße 523 federal roadways and Bundesautobahn 81. It is also connected to Germany's railways by the Rottweil–Villingen railway, which passes through the municipality.
