= Hohenkarpfen =

Coordinates: 48°03′N 8°43′E

Highest point
- Elevation: 912 m (2,992 ft)
- Isolation: 1.31 km (0.81 mi) to Ger

Geography
- Location: Baden-Württemberg, Germany

Hohenkarpfen is a mountain of Baden-Württemberg, Germany. It is a popular tourist destination due to its picturesque shape and the view over the Black Forest. The peak has been a nature reserve since the 1930s.
