= Königsfeld im Schwarzwald =

- Municipality
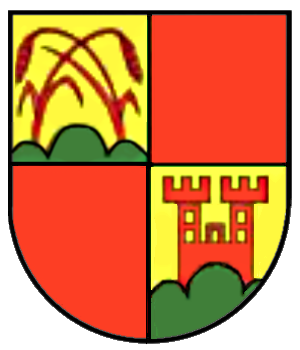
- Coat of arms

- Location of Königsfeld im Schwarzwald within Schwarzwald-Baar-Kreis district
- Interactive map of Königsfeld im Schwarzwald
- Location within Germany Location within Baden-Württemberg
- Coordinates: 48°08′18″N 08°25′17″E
- Country: Germany
- State: Baden-Württemberg
- Admin. region: Freiburg
- District: Schwarzwald-Baar-Kreis

Government
  - Mayor (2023–31): Fritz Link (CDU)

Area
  - Total: 40.24 km^{2} (15.54 sq mi)
- Elevation: 769 m (2,523 ft)

Population (2025-12-31)
  - Total: 5,898
  - Density: 146.6/km^{2} (379.6/sq mi)
- Time zone: UTC+01:00 (CET)
  - Summer (DST): UTC+02:00 (CEST)
- Postal codes: 78126
- Dialling codes: 07725
- Vehicle registration: VS
- Website: www.koenigsfeld.de

Königsfeld im Schwarzwald (Low Alemannic: Kinnigsfeld) is a town in the district of Schwarzwald-Baar in Baden-Württemberg in Germany. It is the northernmost town of the district Schwarzwald Baar. Königsfeld has six boroughs (Königsfeld, Neuhausen, Erdmannsweiler, Buchenberg, Burgberg and Weiler). Founded in 1807, it is a centre of the Moravian Church. Until after the Second World War, most of the town's inhabitants continued to be Moravians and the Vorsteher (congregational business manager) of the Congregation also served as de facto Mayor of the town. After the war, great numbers of refugees from former eastern provinces of Germany settled in the town. Königsfeld is on several major bus lines, the next train stations are in St. Georgen and Villingen-Schwenningen. Regional bus lines connect Königsfeld to these towns. Until 1981 it was served by the train station Peterzell-Königsfeld, 5 km outside Königsfeld. Königsfeld is the seat of several boarding schools and a classical Gymnasium/High School/Public School and a School for Home Economics, all operated by the Moravian Church. Humanitarian Albert Schweizer maintained a home in Königsfeld because his wife could not live in Lambaréné due to her health. His home in Königsfeld is now a museum. There is also a small museum dealing with the history of the town.

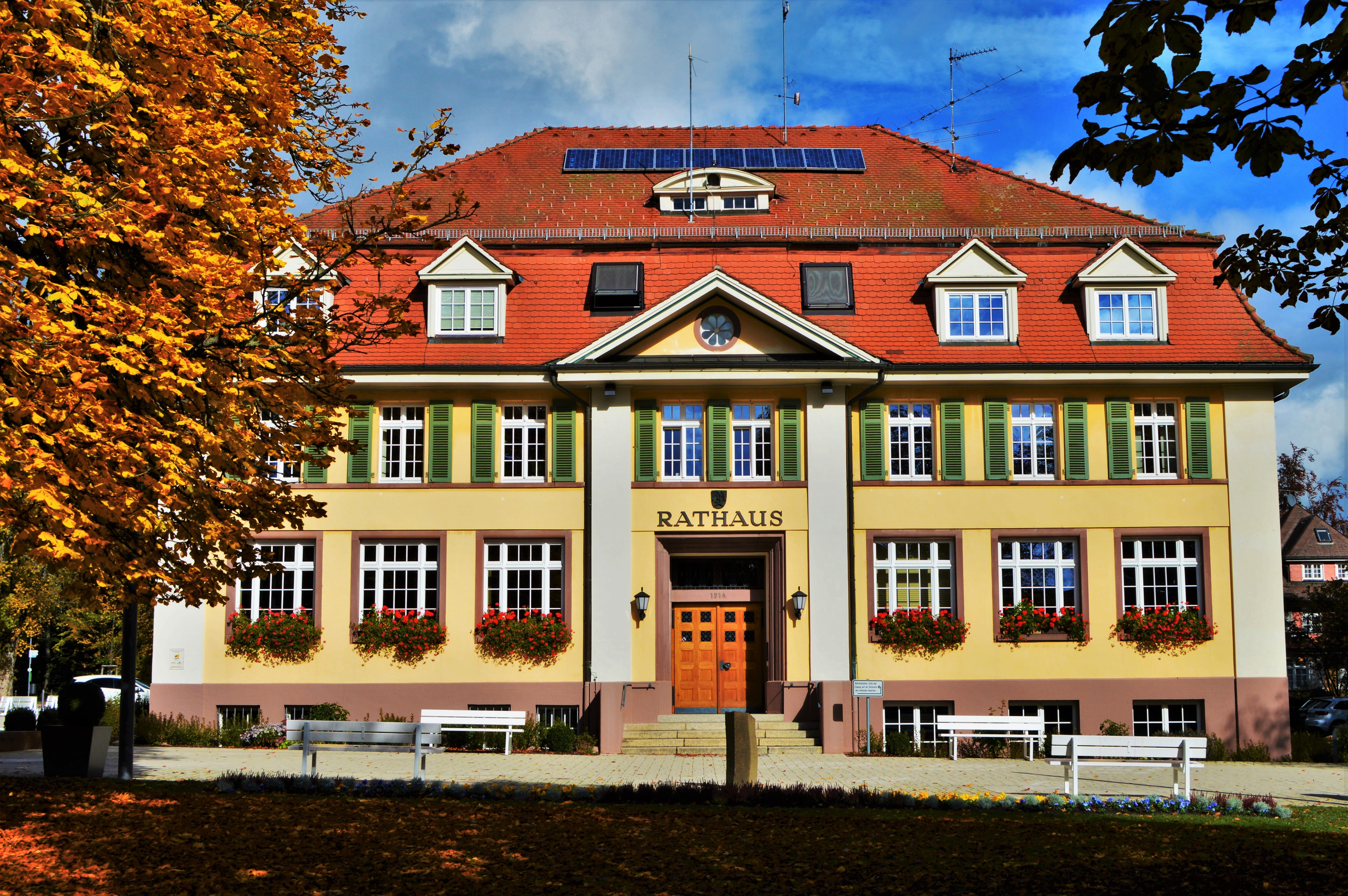
Town hall

== Demographics ==
Population development:

Year	Inhabitants
1990	5,966
2001	5,984
2011	5,866
2021	5,939
