= Brigachtal =

- Municipality
- Coat of arms

- Location of Brigachtal within Schwarzwald-Baar-Kreis district
- Interactive map of Brigachtal
- Location within Germany Location within Baden-Württemberg
- Coordinates: 48°00′23″N 08°28′06″E
- Country: Germany
- State: Baden-Württemberg
- Admin. region: Freiburg
- District: Schwarzwald-Baar-Kreis

Government
  - Mayor (2018–26): Michael Schmitt

Area
  - Total: 22.80 km^{2} (8.80 sq mi)
- Elevation: 705 m (2,313 ft)

Population (2025-12-31)
  - Total: 5,026
  - Density: 220.4/km^{2} (570.9/sq mi)
- Time zone: UTC+01:00 (CET)
  - Summer (DST): UTC+02:00 (CEST)
- Postal codes: 78086
- Dialling codes: 07721
- Vehicle registration: VS
- Website: www.brigachtal.de

Brigachtal is a municipality in the district of Schwarzwald-Baar in Baden-Württemberg in Germany.
