= Bad Dürrheim =

- Town
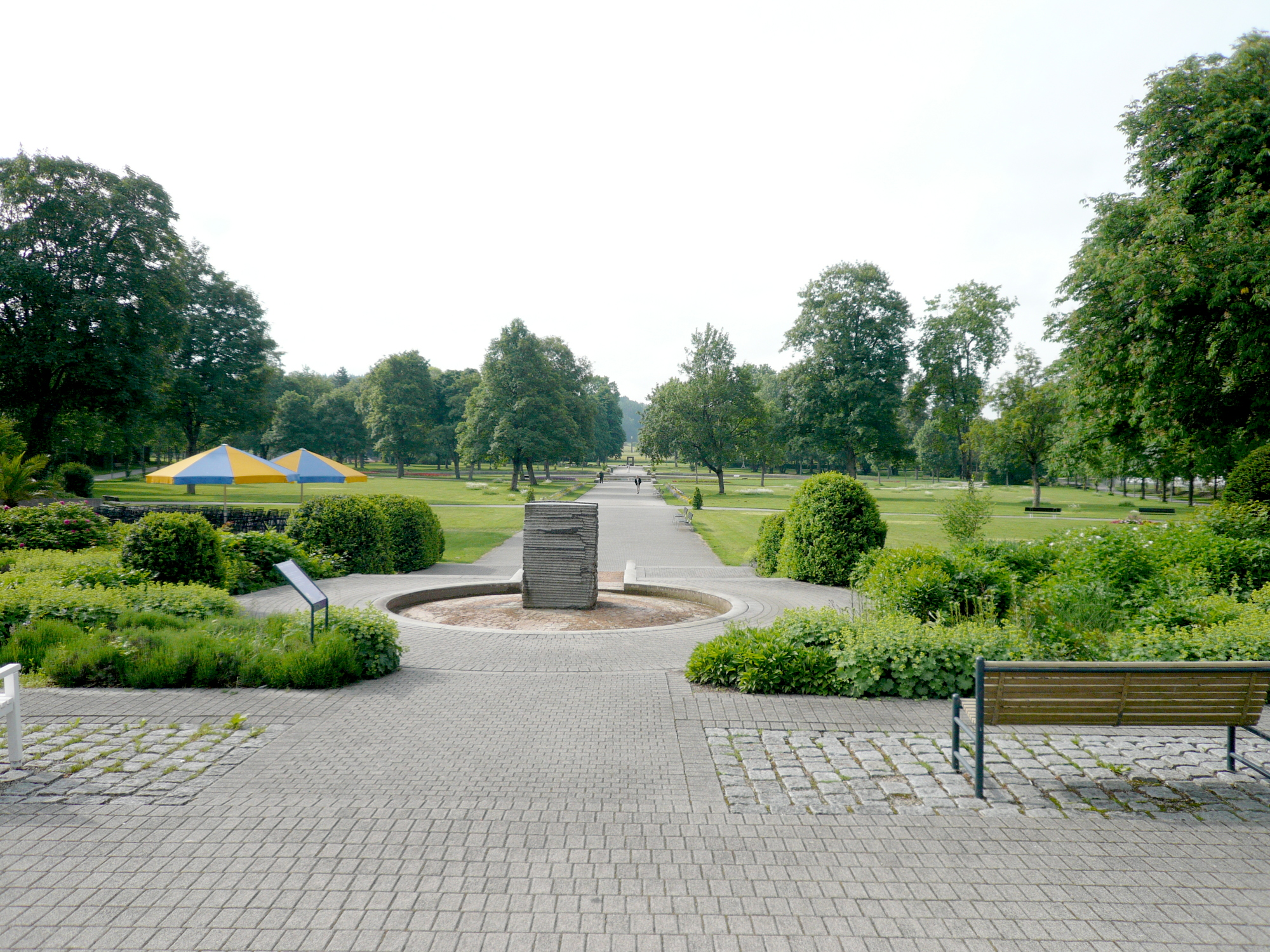
- Bad Dürrheim Spa park

- Coat of arms

- Location of Bad Dürrheim within Schwarzwald-Baar-Kreis district
- Interactive map of Bad Dürrheim
- Location within Germany Location within Baden-Württemberg
- Coordinates: 48°01′N 08°32′E
- Country: Germany
- State: Baden-Württemberg
- Admin. region: Freiburg
- District: Schwarzwald-Baar-Kreis

Government
  - Mayor (2019–27): Jonathan Berggötz (Ind.)

Area
  - Total: 62.08 km^{2} (23.97 sq mi)
- Elevation: 703 m (2,306 ft)

Population (2025-12-31)
  - Total: 13,084
  - Density: 210.8/km^{2} (545.9/sq mi)
- Time zone: UTC+01:00 (CET)
  - Summer (DST): UTC+02:00 (CEST)
- Postal codes: 78073
- Dialling codes: 07726 / 07706
- Vehicle registration: VS
- Website: www.bad-duerrheim.info

Bad Dürrheim (German pronunciation: [baːt ˈdʏʁhaɪm]; Low Alemannic: Diirä) is a town in the district of Schwarzwald-Baar, in Baden-Württemberg, Germany. It is situated east of the Black Forest, 8 km (5.0 mi) north of Donaueschingen, and 6 km (3.7 mi) southeast of Villingen.

From 1951 until 1978, Bad Dürrheim was a location of a broadcasting transmitter for mediumwave.

== Mayors ==
- 1946–1954: Wilhelm Grießhaber
- 1954–1979: Otto Weissenberger
- 1979–2003: Gerhard Hagmann
- 2003–2019: Walter Klumpp
- 2019– : Jonathan Berggötz

== Twin towns — sister cities ==
Bad Dürrheim is twinned with:

- Hajdúszoboszló, Hungary
- Enghien-les-Bains, France
- Spotorno, Italy

== Honorary citizens ==
- 1937: Walter Köhler (1897–1989), politician (NSDAP), (Minister-President of Baden), honorary citizenship cancelled on 28 May 1946 by order of the District Administrator Bienzeisler of Villingen
