= Unterkirnach =

- Municipality
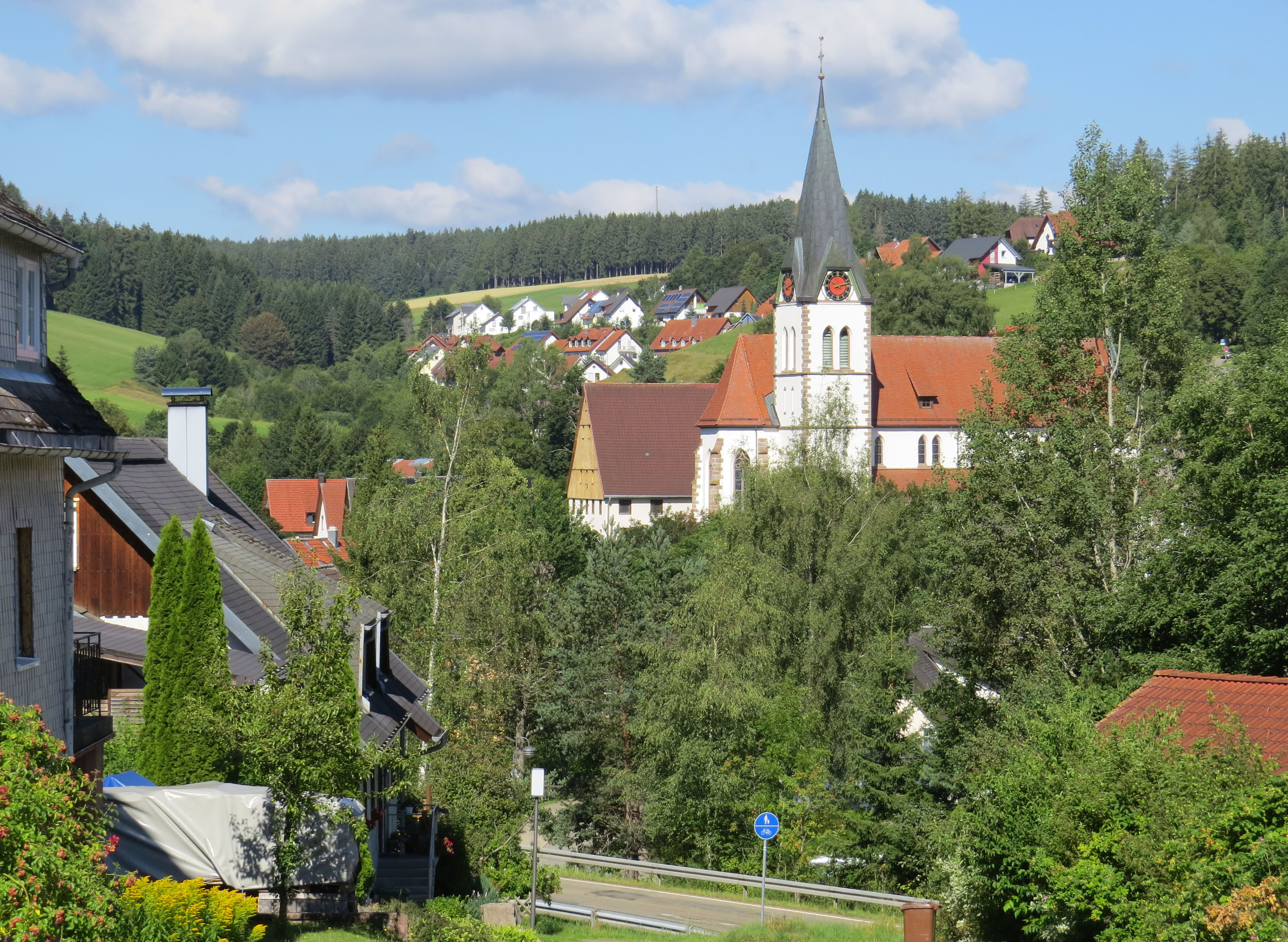
- Unterkirnach

- Coat of arms

- Location of Unterkirnach within Schwarzwald-Baar-Kreis district
- Interactive map of Unterkirnach
- Location within Germany Location within Baden-Württemberg
- Coordinates: 48°04′44″N 08°21′53″E
- Country: Germany
- State: Baden-Württemberg
- Admin. region: Freiburg
- District: Schwarzwald-Baar-Kreis

Government
  - Mayor (2021–29): Andreas Braun

Area
  - Total: 13.17 km^{2} (5.08 sq mi)
- Elevation: 815 m (2,674 ft)

Population (2025-12-31)
  - Total: 2,444
  - Density: 185.6/km^{2} (480.6/sq mi)
- Time zone: UTC+01:00 (CET)
  - Summer (DST): UTC+02:00 (CEST)
- Postal codes: 78089
- Dialling codes: 07721
- Vehicle registration: VS
- Website: www.unterkirnach.de

Unterkirnach is a municipality in the district of Schwarzwald-Baar in Baden-Württemberg in Germany, situated in the Black Forest and 40 km east of Freiburg.
