= Bräunlingen =

- Town
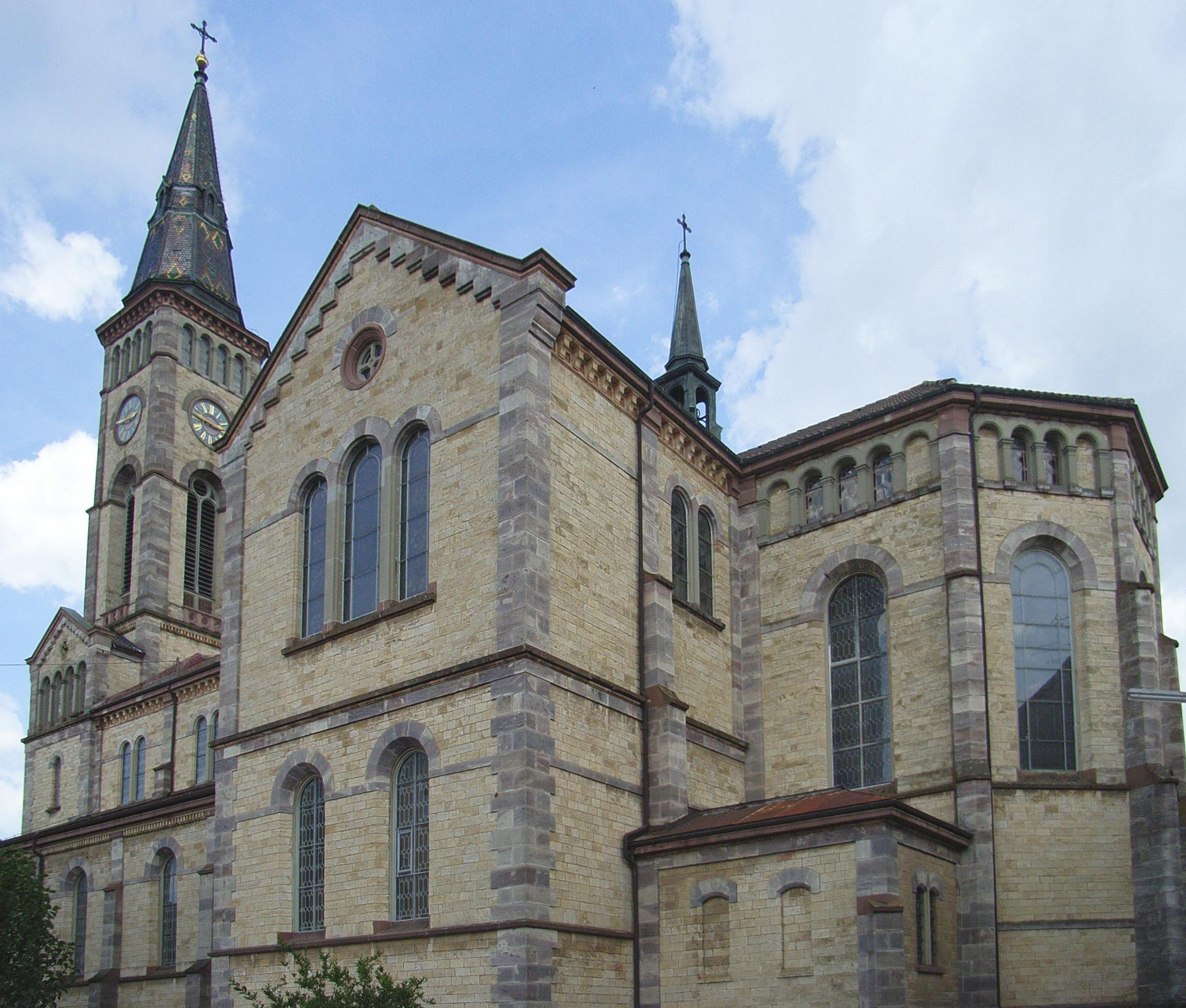
- Church

- Coat of arms

- Location of Bräunlingen within Schwarzwald-Baar-Kreis district
- Interactive map of Bräunlingen
- Location within Germany Location within Baden-Württemberg
- Coordinates: 47°55′47″N 08°26′53″E
- Country: Germany
- State: Baden-Württemberg
- Admin. region: Freiburg
- District: Schwarzwald-Baar-Kreis
- Subdivisions: 5 Stadtteile

Government
  - Mayor (2017–25): Micha Bächle (Ind.)

Area
  - Total: 62.14 km^{2} (23.99 sq mi)
- Elevation: 693 m (2,274 ft)

Population (2025-12-31)
  - Total: 5,843
  - Density: 94.03/km^{2} (243.5/sq mi)
- Time zone: UTC+01:00 (CET)
  - Summer (DST): UTC+02:00 (CEST)
- Postal codes: 78199
- Dialling codes: 0771, 07707, 07705
- Vehicle registration: VS
- Website: www.braeunlingen.de

Bräunlingen (German pronunciation: [ˈbʁɔʏnlɪŋən]; Low Alemannic: Briilinge) is a town in the district of Schwarzwald-Baar, in Baden-Württemberg, Germany. It is situated on the river Breg, 4 km southwest of Donaueschingen.

== Sons and daughters of the city ==
- Johann Baptist Weber (1756–1826), master builder of the early Classicism in southwest Germany
- Hermann Ohlicher (born 1949), former soccer player (VfB Stuttgart).
