= Schwarzwald-Baar-Kreis =

Coordinates: 48°01′N 8°26′E

- District
- Flag Coat of arms
- Country: Germany
- State: Baden-Württemberg
- Adm. region: Freiburg
- Capital: Villingen-Schwenningen

Government
  - District admin.: Sven Hinterseh (CDU)

Area
  - Total: 1,025.23 km^{2} (395.84 sq mi)

Population (31 December 2025)
  - Total: 213,680
  - Density: 208.42/km^{2} (539.81/sq mi)
- Time zone: UTC+01:00 (CET)
  - Summer (DST): UTC+02:00 (CEST)
- Vehicle registration: VS
- Website: https://www.lrasbk.de

Schwarzwald-Baar (German pronunciation: [ˌʃvaʁtsvaltˈbaːɐ̯]) is a Landkreis (district) in the south of Baden-Württemberg, Germany. Neighboring districts are (from north clockwise) Ortenaukreis, Rottweil, Tuttlingen, Constance, the Swiss canton of Schaffhausen, and the districts Waldshut, Breisgau-Hochschwarzwald and Emmendingen.

== History ==
The district was created in 1973, when the districts of Donaueschingen and Villingen were merged.

== Geography ==
The district got its name from the two predominant landscapes in the district. The Black Forest (Schwarzwald), and the Baar, the foothills between the Black Forest and the Swabian Jura (Schwäbische Alb). Both the Danube River and the Neckar River have their origins in the Schwarzwald and Baar district.

== Coat of arms ==
The coat of arms is modeled after the two coat of arms of the cities of Villingen and Schwenningen. Villingen had a horizontally divided blue-and-white arms, while Schwenningen had a vertically divided blue-and-white arms. Combining both divisions gives the four fields. The eagle in the top-left quarter is taken from the coat of arms of the city of Villingen, and derives from the Zähringen family who ruled that city in the 13th century. When the cities of Villingen and Schwenningen merged to form Villingen-Schwenningen in 1972, a similar method was used to derive a new city coat of arms.

== Cities and towns ==
Clickable map of towns and municipalities in the district

Cities
1. Bad Dürrheim (Note: An administrative association/community-free independent city)
2. Blumberg
3. Bräunlingen (Note: Part of the municipal administrative association (gemeindeverwaltungsverband) of Donaueschingen)
4. Donaueschingen
5. Furtwangen im Schwarzwald (Note: Part of the united administrative community (vereinbarte verwaltungsgemeinschaft) of Furtwangen)
6. Hüfingen
7. Sankt Georgen im Schwarzwald
8. Triberg im Schwarzwald (Note: Part of the municipal administrative association (gemeindeverwaltungsverband) of Raumschaft Triberg)
9. Villingen-Schwenningen (Note: Part of the united administrative community (vereinbarte verwaltungsgemeinschaft) of Villingen-Schwenningen)
10. Vöhrenbach
Towns/municipalities
1. Brigachtal
2. Dauchingen
3. Gütenbach
4. Königsfeld im Schwarzwald (Note: An administrative association/community-free independent town/municipality)
5. Mönchweiler
6. Niedereschach
7. Schonach im Schwarzwald
8. Schönwald im Schwarzwald
9. Tuningen
10. Unterkirnach
