= Sankt Georgen im Schwarzwald =

- Town
- Coat of arms

- Location of Sankt Georgen im Schwarzwald within Schwarzwald-Baar-Kreis district
- Interactive map of Sankt Georgen im Schwarzwald
- Location within Germany Location within Baden-Württemberg
- Coordinates: 48°07′29″N 08°19′51″E
- Country: Germany
- State: Baden-Württemberg
- Admin. region: Freiburg
- District: Schwarzwald-Baar-Kreis

Government
  - Mayor (2024–32): Michael Rieger

Area
  - Total: 59.84 km^{2} (23.10 sq mi)
- Elevation: 862 m (2,828 ft)

Population (2025-12-31)
  - Total: 12,262
  - Density: 204.9/km^{2} (530.7/sq mi)
- Time zone: UTC+01:00 (CET)
  - Summer (DST): UTC+02:00 (CEST)
- Postal codes: 78112
- Dialling codes: 07724, 07725
- Vehicle registration: VS
- Website: www.st-georgen.de

St. Georgen im Schwarzwald (German pronunciation: [ˌzaŋkt ˈɡeːɔʁɡn̩ ʔɪm ˈʃvaʁtsvalt], lit. 'St. Georgen in the Black Forest'; sometimes spelled in full as Sankt Georgen im Schwarzwald; Low Alemannic: Sanderge) is a town in Southwestern Baden-Württemberg, Germany and belongs to Schwarzwald-Baar County.

== Museums ==
- Sammlung Grässlin, art museum
- Germans Phono Museum, Phono Museum

== Railway Station ==
Sankt Georgen im Schwarzwald has a railway station on the Schwarzwald Bahn.

== Source of the Danube ==
The Danube starts out as two small streams which join in Donaueschingen (which gives the river its name). The larger stream is the Breg which has its source in Furtwangen im Schwarzwald and the smaller stream is the Brigach which has its source near Sankt Georgen im Schwarzwald.
