= Winterhalder =

Winterhalder is a surname of German origin, meaning "winter slope", referring to someone who lived on a north-facing slope. Notable people with the surname include:

- Edward Winterhalder (born 1955), American author
- Herbert Winterhalder (1879-1946), English footballer
- Johann Michael Winterhalder (1706-1759), German artist
- Josef Winterhalder the Elder (1702-1769), German sculptor
- Josef Winterhalder the Younger (1743-1807), German-Bohemian painter

== See also ==
- Winterhalder & Hofmeier, a German clock manufacturing company
- Winterhalter
