= Josef Winterhalder =

Josef Winterhalder may refer to:

- Josef Winterhalder the Elder (1702–1769), German sculptor
- Josef Winterhalder the Younger (1743–1807), German-Bohemian painter
