= Karl Spindler (novelist) =

German writer (1796–1855)

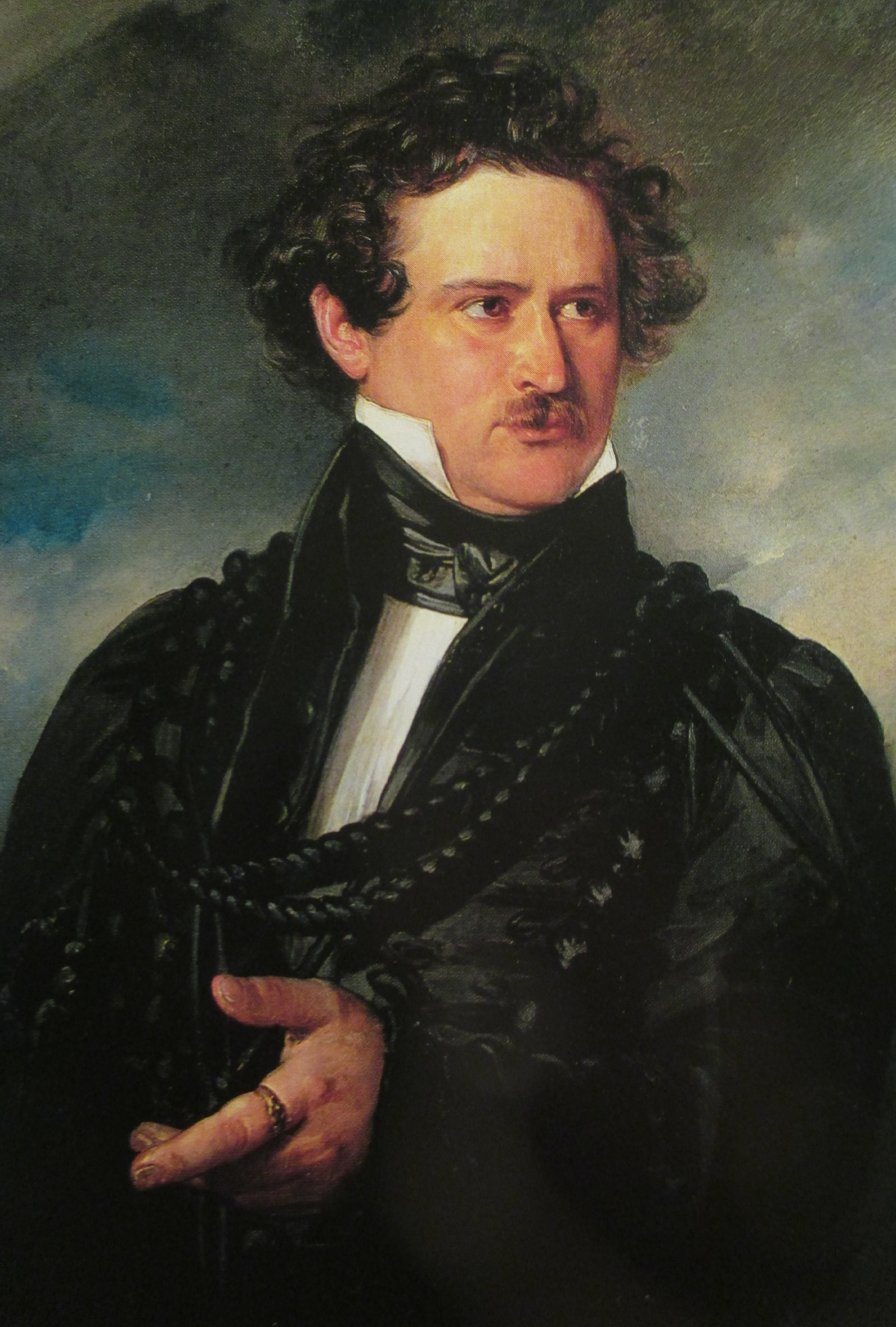
Spindler by Winterhalter.

Karl Spindler (October 16, 1796 – July 12, 1855) was a German novelist.

== Biography ==
Spindler was born in Breslau, and educated at Strasburg. He joined a company of strolling players in Germany, and resided from 1832 at Baden-Baden. He died at Freiersbach, Baden, aged 58.

== Works ==
His reputation rests on his historical romances:

- Der Bastard (3 vols., Zürich, 1826)
- Der Jude (4 vols., Stuttgart, 1827)
- Der Jesuit (3 vols., 1829)
- Der Invalide (5 vols., 1831).

His complete works include 102 volumes (1831–54), besides minor novels contained in his periodical publication Vergissmeinnicht (1830–55).
