= Koněšín =

- Municipality
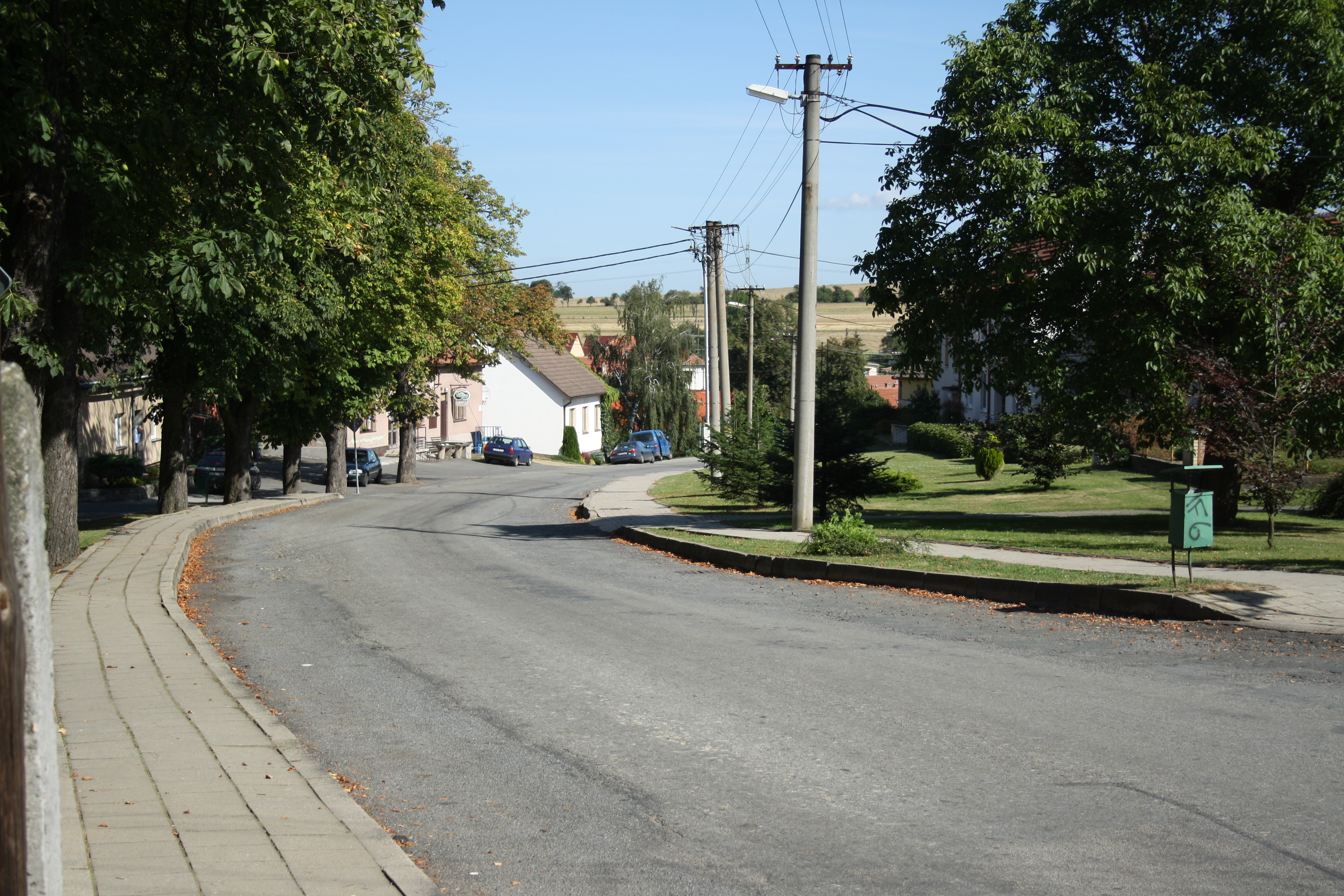
- Centre of Koněšín

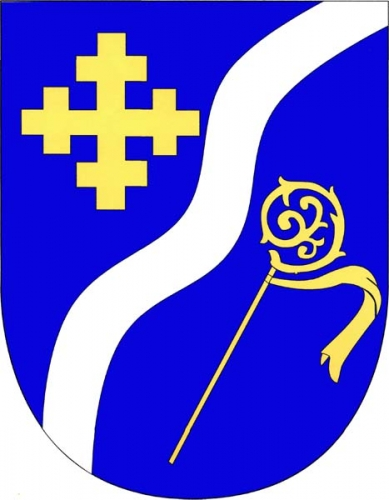
- Coat of arms

- Location in the Czech Republic
- Coordinates: 49°11′26″N 16°2′28″E
- Country: Czech Republic
- Region: Vysočina
- District: Třebíč
- First mentioned: 1104

Area
  - Total: 11.24 km^{2} (4.34 sq mi)
- Elevation: 438 m (1,437 ft)

Population (2026-01-01)
  - Total: 510
  - Density: 45/km^{2} (120/sq mi)
- Time zone: UTC+1 (CET)
  - Summer (DST): UTC+2 (CEST)
- Postal code: 675 02
- Website: www.obeckonesin.cz

Koněšín is a municipality and village in Třebíč District in the Vysočina Region of the Czech Republic. It has about 500 inhabitants.

== Geography ==
Koněšín is located about 11 kilometres (7 mi) east of Třebíč and 40 km (25 mi) west of Brno. It lies in the Jevišovice Uplands. The highest point is at 476 m (1,562 ft) above sea level. In the west and south, the municipal border is formed by the Jihlava River and by the Dalešice Reservoir built on it.

== History ==
The first written mention of Koněšín is from 1104, when a marketplace was located there. Until 1557, it was property of the monastery in Třebíč. After 1557, it was part of the Náměšť nad Oslavou estate.

== Demographics ==
Historical population

Year	Pop.	±%
1869	421	—
1880	441	+4.8%
1890	516	+17.0%
1900	592	+14.7%
1910	601	+1.5%

Year	Pop.	±%
1921	580	−3.5%
1930	649	+11.9%
1950	530	−18.3%
1961	590	+11.3%
1970	562	−4.7%

Year	Pop.	±%
1980	554	−1.4%
1991	511	−7.8%
2001	476	−6.8%
2011	469	−1.5%
2021	490	+4.5%

Source: Censuses

== Transport ==
The I/23 road (the section from Třebíč to Rosice) runs along the northern municipal border.

== Sights ==
The main landmark of Koněšín is the Church of Saint Bartholomew. It is an early Baroque church with a Romanesque core, built in 1663–1679. The prismatic tower was added in 1729.
