= Karel František Koch =

Czech doctor and humanitarian (1890–1981)

- Born: 29 June 1890; Náměšť nad Oslavou, Austria-Hungary
- Died: 24 January 1981 (aged 90); Toronto, Canada
- Known for: Rescuing Jews during the Holocaust
- Spouse: Josefína Kellen
- Awards: Righteous Among the Nations

Academic work
- Discipline: Surgery
- Institutions: Comenius University
- Main interests: Disability rights

Karel František Koch (29 June 1890 – 24 January 1981) was a Czech doctor known for rescuing Jews in Bratislava during the Holocaust. After the Communist takeover, he was jailed, but managed to escape the country shortly after the Warsaw Pact invasion of Czechoslovakia in 1968 and settled in Canada.

== Life ==
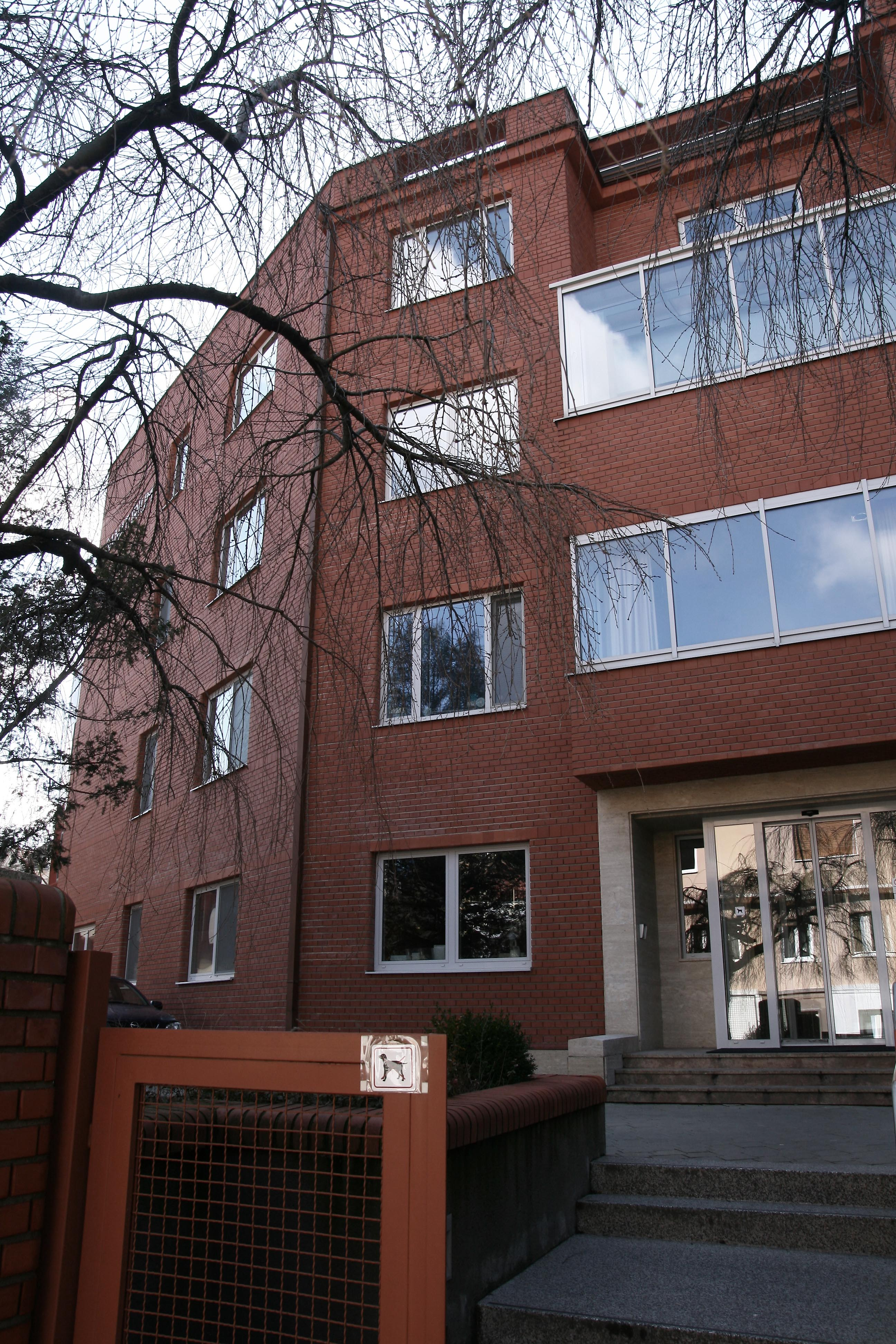
Koch's sanatorium

Koch was born in Náměšť nad Oslavou, then Austria-Hungary, in 1890, the son of a railway worker. After studying medicine in Brno, Prague, and Vienna, he moved to Bratislava in 1919 (shortly after the establishment of the First Czechoslovak Republic). In 1927, he became a member of the Faculty of Medicine at Comenius University. Between 1929 and 1931, Koch had a sanatorium (cs, sk) designed by his friend, architect Dušan Jurkovič, and surrounded with a garden with 130 species of plants. The expense left him in debt for the rest of his life. Among his patients were R. W. Seton-Watson and Andrej Hlinka. He argued for the rehabilitation of disabled children, and was a strong supporter of the liberal ideals of President Tomáš Garrigue Masaryk.

In 1939, the Slovak State declared independence and Nazi Germany invaded the Czech lands, establishing the Protectorate of Bohemia and Moravia. As an ethnic Czech, Koch faced discrimination in the Slovak State and was dismissed from his faculty post. In 1941, he was arrested by the Gestapo and spent a three months imprisoned in Brno and Vienna.

Koch belonged to the Czech anti-fascist group Obrana národa and saved the lives of several Jews from Nazi persecution. During the wave of deportations in 1942, he helped some hide in various hospitals until the deportations had stopped. In 1944, when the Germans invaded and resumed deportations, Koch built several bunkers around Bratislava. One of these was used by Rabbi Michael Dov Weissmandl after he jumped from a train headed for Auschwitz concentration camp, where his family was murdered. Koch personally brought Weissmandl food and other necessities. He convinced some of his friends to hide other Jews in their homes. Wanted by the Gestapo, Koch evaded arrest until the liberation of Bratislava by the Red Army in April 1945. After the war he married Josefína Kellen, one of the Jews that he had saved.

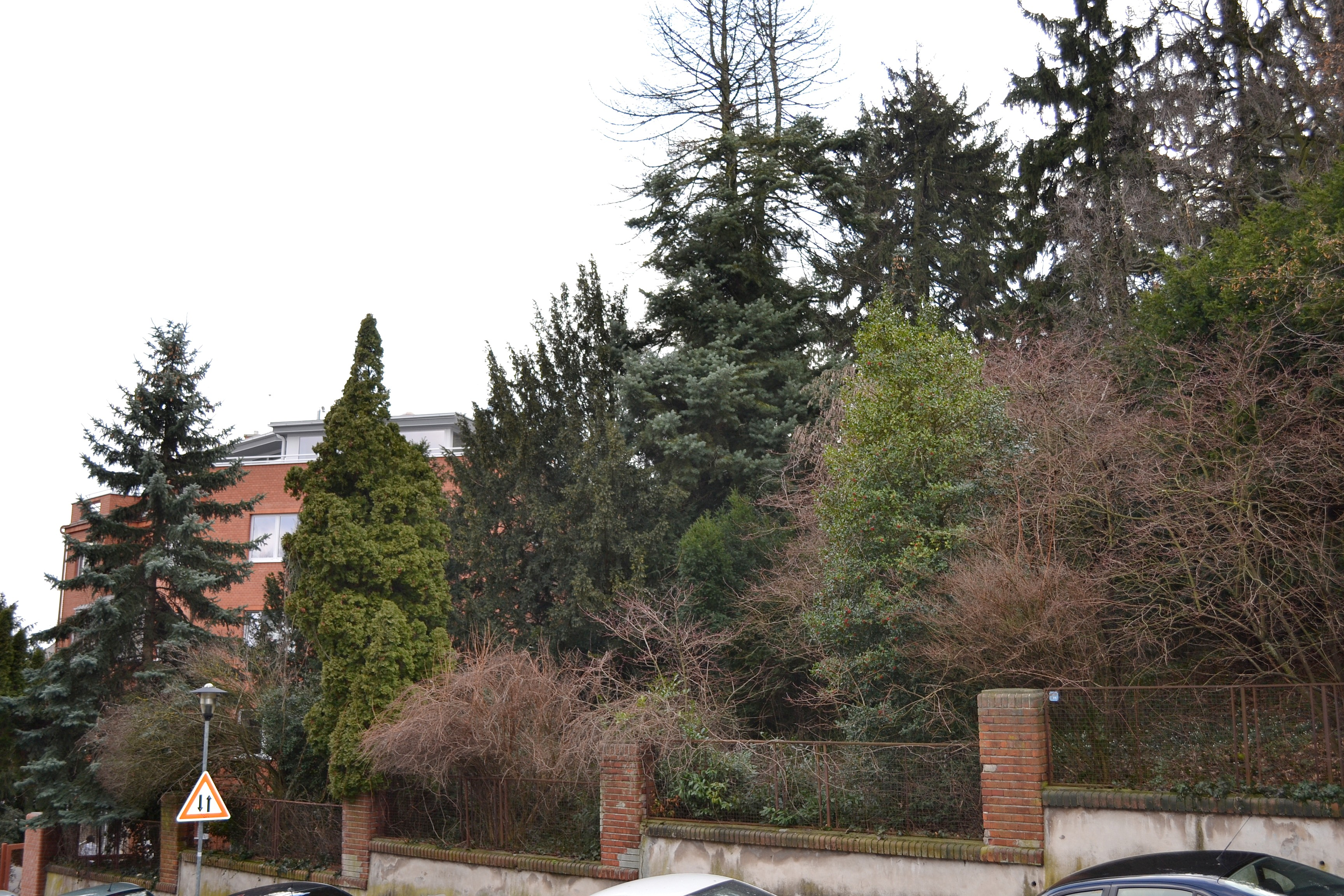
Garden outside the sanatorium

In 1946, he performed surgery on the chief rabbi of Slovakia, Armin Frieder, who died two days later at the age of 34. At the time, some Jews blamed Koch for Frieder's death, but the accusation had no merit according to Armin's brother Emanuel. The same year, Koch published a book, stating that the antisemitic incidents that he witnessed in Bratislava in the summer of 1945 were "not antisemitism, but something far worse—the robber’s anxiety that he might have to return Jewish property," a view that has been endorsed by scholar Robert Pynsent. In his book, Koch did not capitalize words such as "germans, germany, hitler, himmler, mein kampf," "ss", and "fürer" [sic]. Pynsent finds it strange that Koch could "stoop to such a petty device".

After the 1948 Communist coup, Koch remained in Bratislava. In 1951, he was arrested and accused of espionage; he was imprisoned between 1951 and 1963. Following the Prague Spring and the Warsaw Pact invasion of Czechoslovakia, Koch fled the country with his wife and son and settled in Canada. He died in Toronto in 1981.

== Legacy ==
For many years, Koch was little-known compared to his achievements as a doctor and humanitarian. In 2008, a biography, Zabudnite na Kocha ("Forget about Koch") was published. He was recognized as Righteous Among the Nations in 1971. There is a tree planted for Koch in the Avenue of the Righteous at Yad Vashem in Jerusalem.

== Works ==
- Koch, Karel František (1946). Slovo má lidskost. Prague: Vladimír Žikeš.
