= Náměšť nad Oslavou bridge =

Náměšť nad Oslavou Bridge
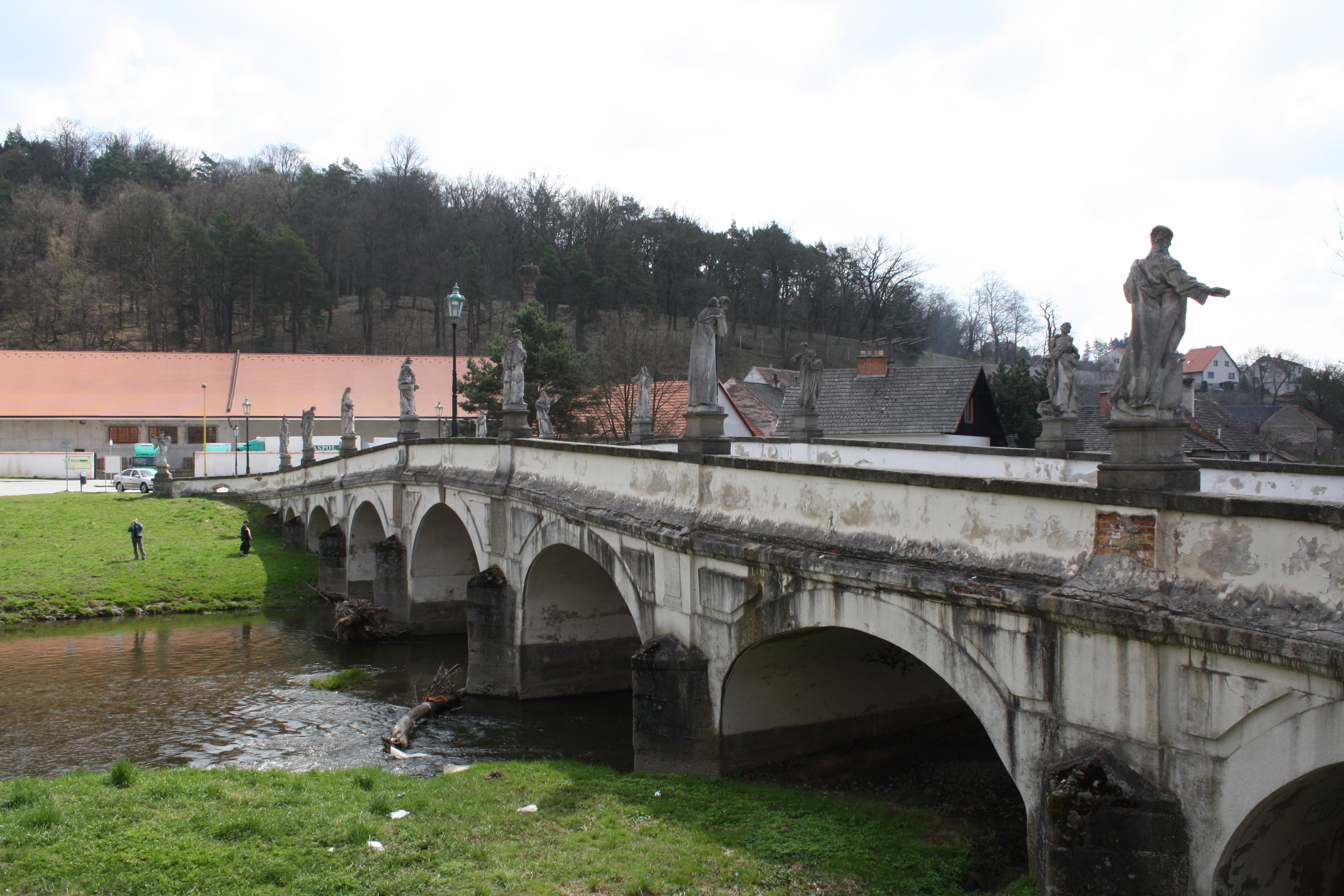
- Baroque bridge in Náměšť nad Oslavou
- Coordinates: 49.206817°N 16.159053°E
- Crosses: Oslava
- Locale: Náměšť nad Oslavou, Czech Republic
- Official name: Barokní most
- Heritage status: Cultural monument

Characteristics
- Material: Stone, limestone
- Total length: 62 metres (203 ft)
- Width: 8 metres (26 ft)
- Height: 6.2 metres (20 ft)

History
- Construction start: 1733
- Opened: 1744

Náměšť nad Oslavou bridge (Czech: most v Náměšti nad Oslavou) is a baroque bridge in the town of Náměšť nad Oslavou in the Czech Republic. It is an arched road bridge with sculptural decoration by Josef Winterhalder. It is the second largest Czech bridge with the richest sculptural decoration following the Charles Bridge hence it is sometimes referred to as the "Little Charles Bridge". It was built by Count Václav Adrian of Enkenvoirt in 1737.The statues were added around 1744 when they were ordained. Today the bridge is designed for pedestrian traffic only.

== Description ==
The bridge that spans the Oslava river has a straight, unbroken ground plan, it is 62 meters long and 8 meters wide. The bridge deck is slightly arched and thus the highest bridge point is 6.2 meters above the river. The railing is 0.5 meters wide, each of the three triangular pillars, which are connected by elliptical arches, is 2 meters wide. The span of the largest arch is 10 meters, its height is 5 meters. A total of twenty limestone sculptures beautifies the bridge, ten on each side. They are about 2 m high, made of one piece of material. The bridge itself is built of stone and brick, it is plastered. The road is paved with granite cobblestones.

In the past, the bridge was built to connect the Náměšť nad Oslavou Castle with the town. In modern days a main thoroughfare between Třebíč and Brno led through it until 1986.

== History ==
The bridge was built after 1733, when the estate owner Jan Filip Werdenberk died. The estate went to Václav Adrian of Enckevoirt who initiated the bridge construction on the site of a previous bridge pulled down by the flood. New bridge's decoration was already in the patronage of the other estate owners – Marie Francis and Hanus Leopold of Kufstein. Both were very pious Catholics and thus had the bridge fitted with twenty statues of saints and angels. The ensemble was to be completed in 1744. Two years later Haugwitz family bought the estate. In 1812 the bridge was damaged by the July flood and Henry William III Haugwitz had it repaired. The bridge underwent additional reconstructions in 1907, in 1932 and in 1984. In 1984 the sculptures were restored as well and their copies were made. The originals were placed in the castle, in the underground hall called Lutheran. During the great flood of 1985, the bridge was not significantly damaged, however it suffered from the heavy traffic, on average 5000 cars per day. One year later a new bridge over the Oslava river was completed and all the bridge traffic was diverted to it.

Further reconstruction took place in 1989 and was completed three years later. However, in 2019 it was announced that the bridge is in a state of disrepair despite the 1989 reconstruction. At that time a reinforced concrete slab spanning the stone arches was put in to strengthen the bridge structure. However, it prevented it from expanding and shrinking with temperature changes instead and this caused cracks to develop in its structure. New reconstruction is scheduled to start in 2020 with the budgeted cost in millions of CZK.

== Statues ==
On the bridge there are 16 statues of saints and 4 statues of angels created between 1737 and 1744. Originally it was assumed that all the statues were sculpted by Josef Winterhalder the Elder, but a formal analysis and preserved sketches proved that he involved in the creation of only eight to twelve statues. However, the rest of the figurative decoration was created by other authors, mainly by the Czech sculptor Alexander Jelínek, according to his design.

The angels at both ends of the bridge, the Archangel Gabriel, the Archangel Michael, the Archangel Rafael and the angel at the gates of heaven, were supposed to protect the entrance to the town. The statues of saints represent a celestial army with patrons of the town and the owners of the estate. They are mostly saints who were popular at the time the sculptures were designed and who are often portrayed (St. John of Nepomuk, St. Anne, St. Francis, St. Leopold, St. Wenceslaus, St. Theresa, St. Cajetan, St. Philip of Neri).

== Recognition ==
It was declared a cultural monument in 1958. It has been part of the Náměšť nad Oslavou urban monument zone since 1990.

In 2012 the Czech National bank issued a 5000 CZK commemorative gold coin as part of the Bridges in the Czech Republic series. The coin was designed by Martin Dašek.

== Gallery ==
Bridge Statues

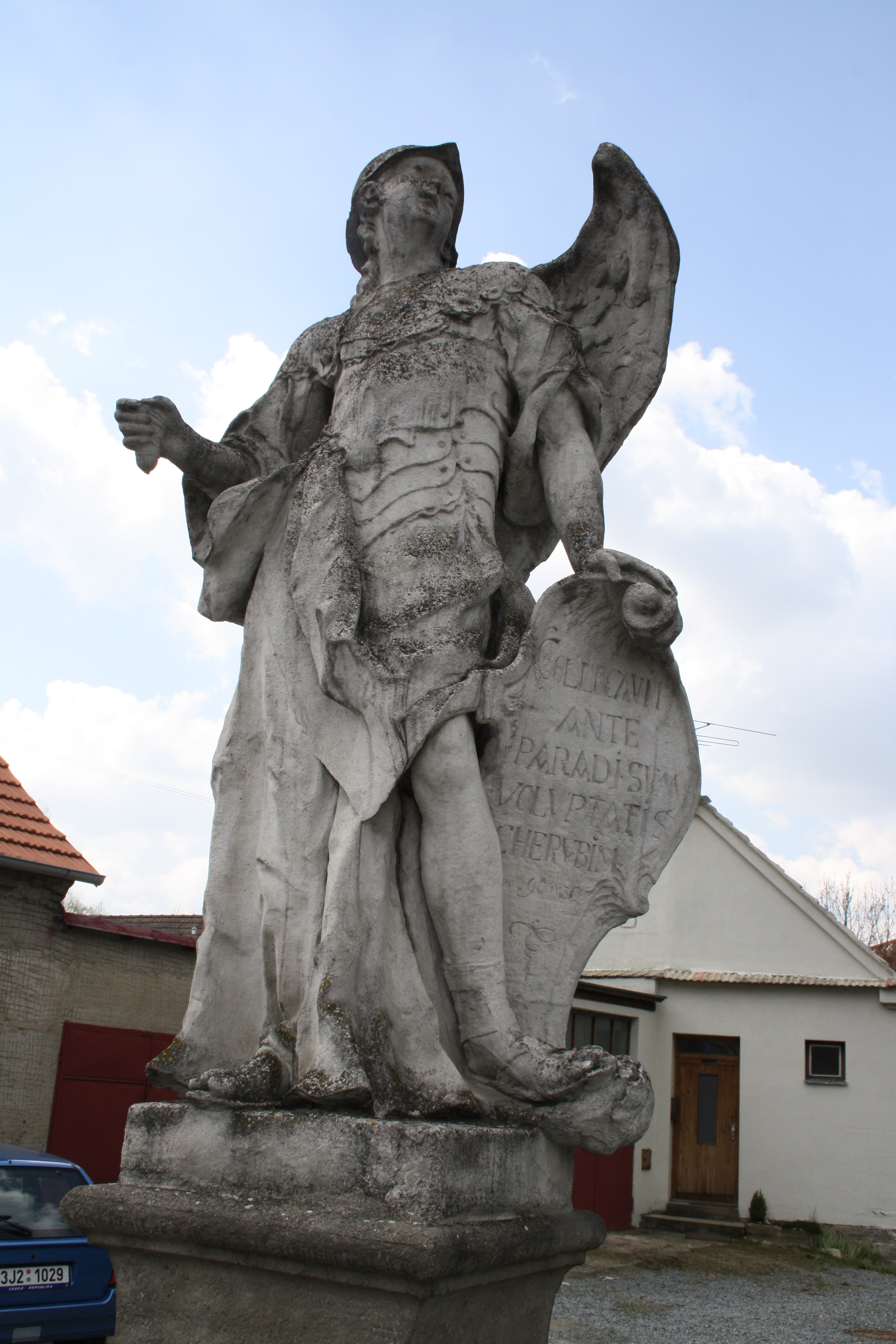
Statue of the angel at the gate of heaven

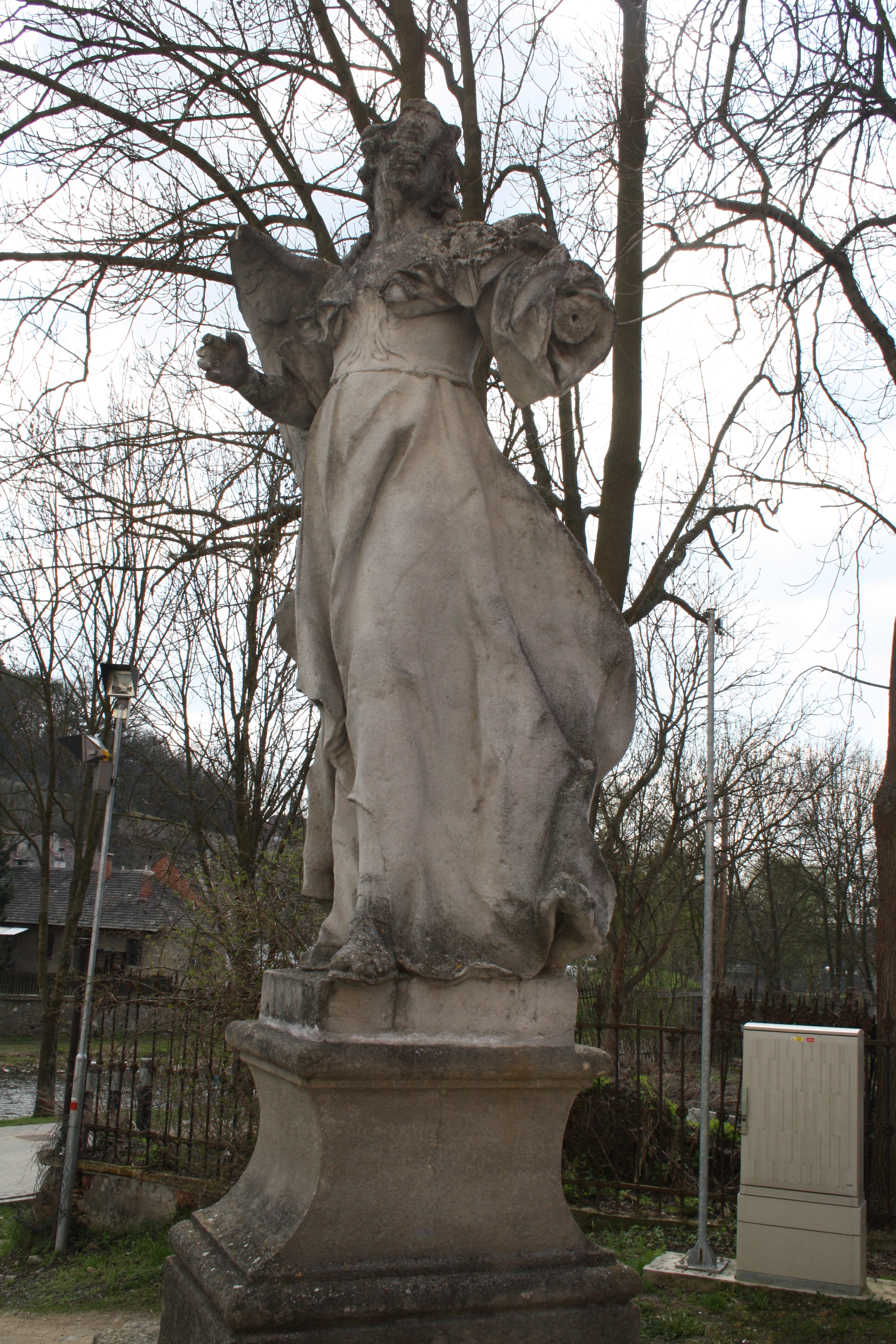
Statue of archangel Gabriel

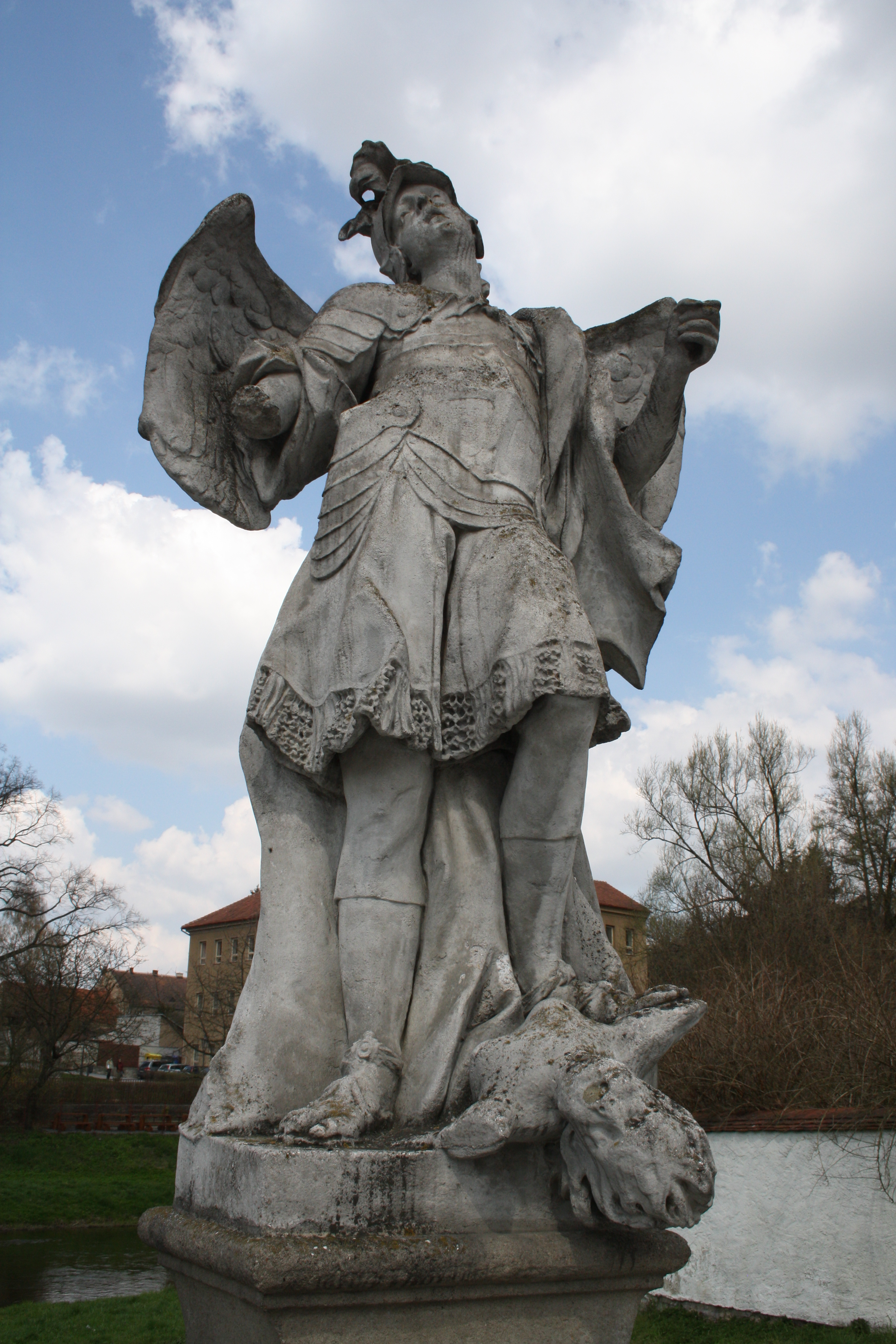
Statue of archangel Michael

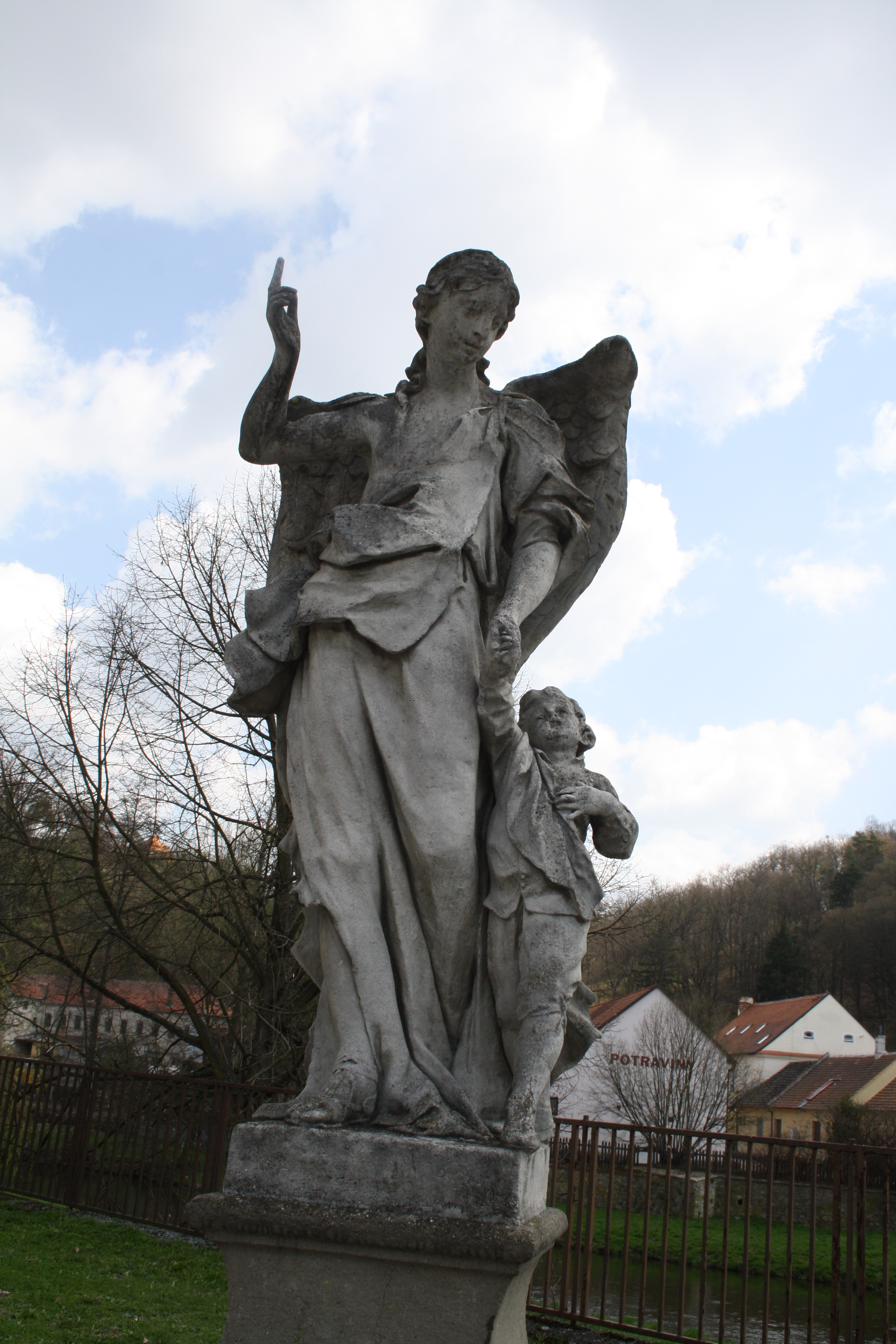
Statue of archangel Rafael

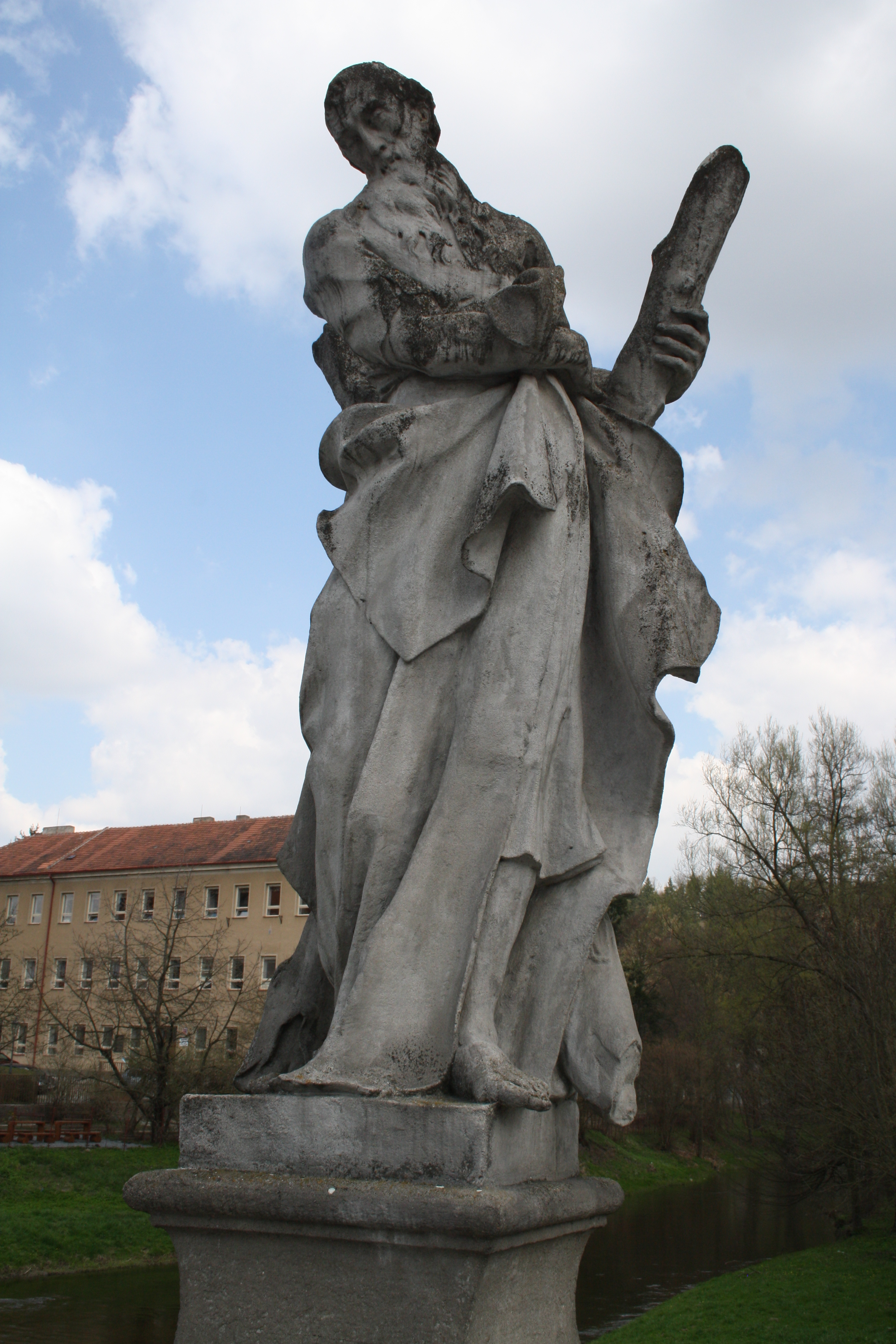
Statue of Saint Andrew

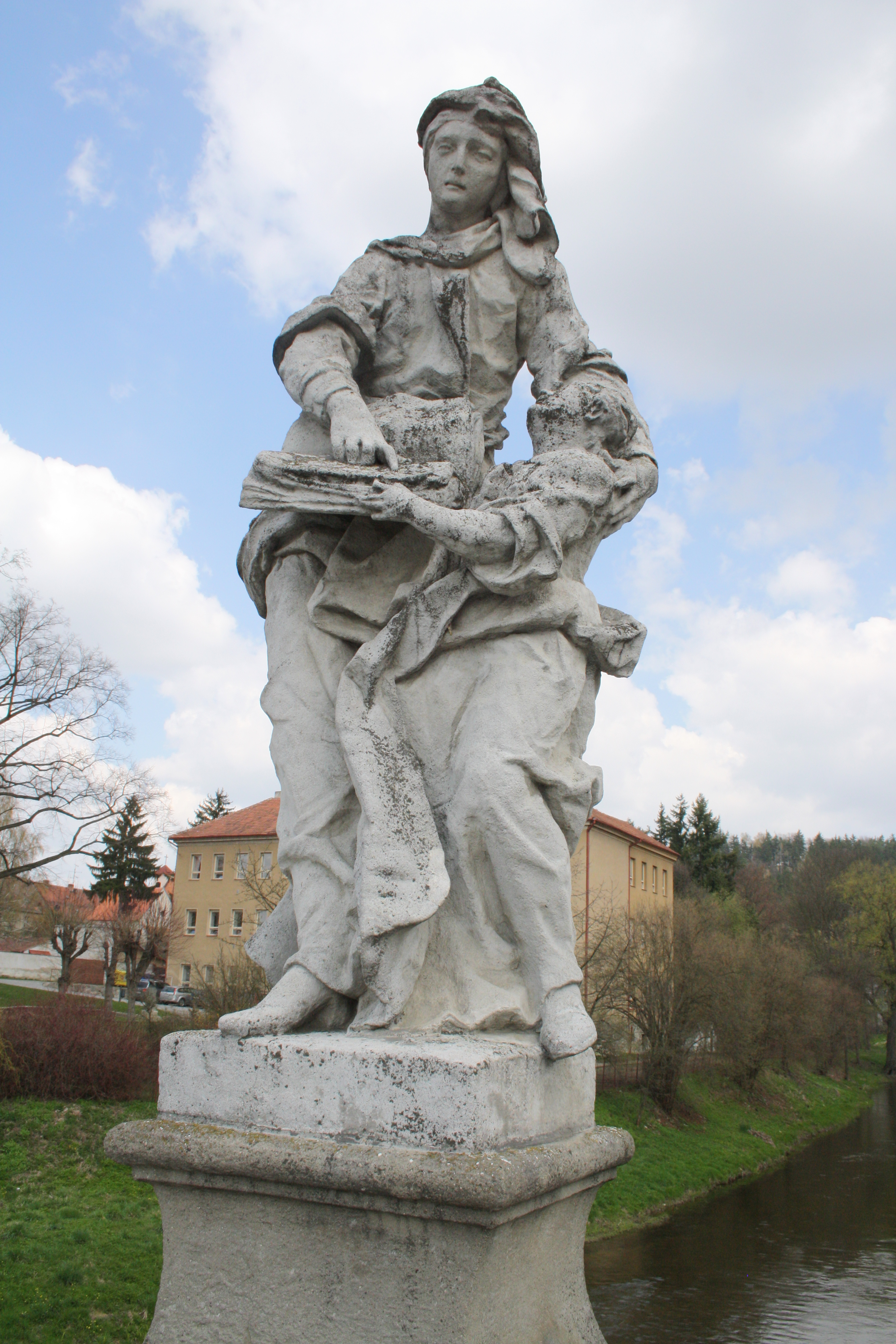
Statue of Saint Anne with Mary

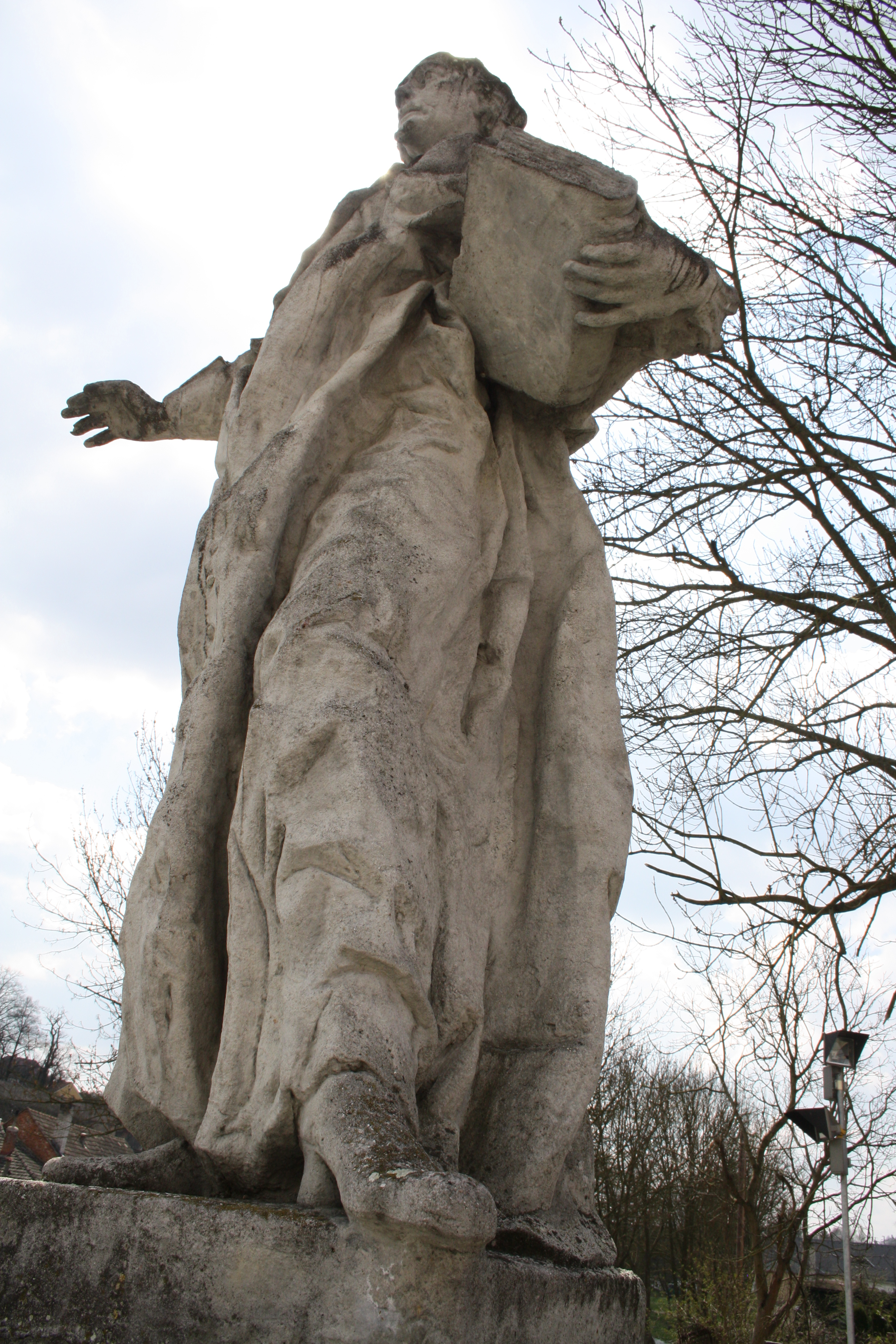
Statue of Saint Cajetan

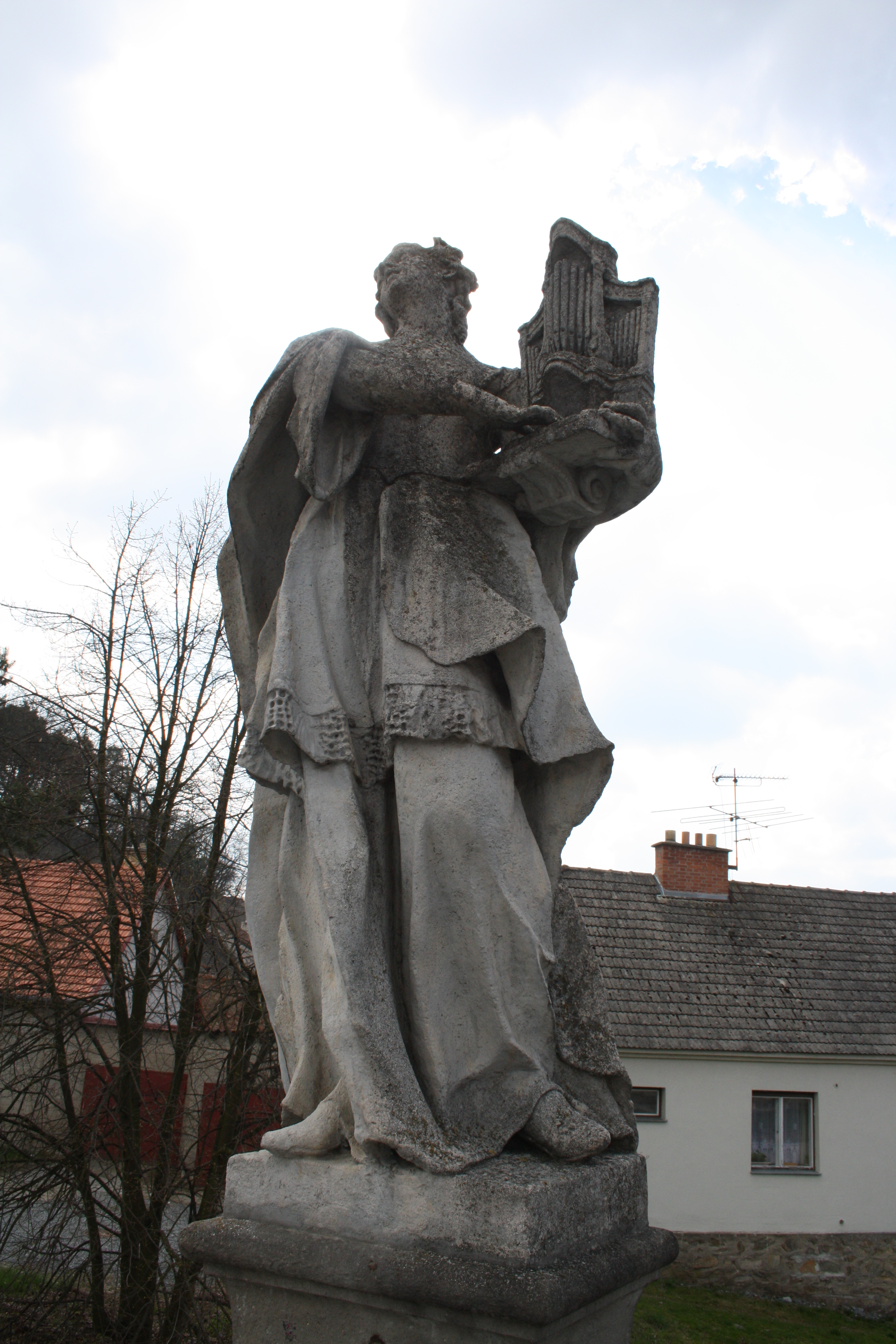
Statue of Saint Cecilia

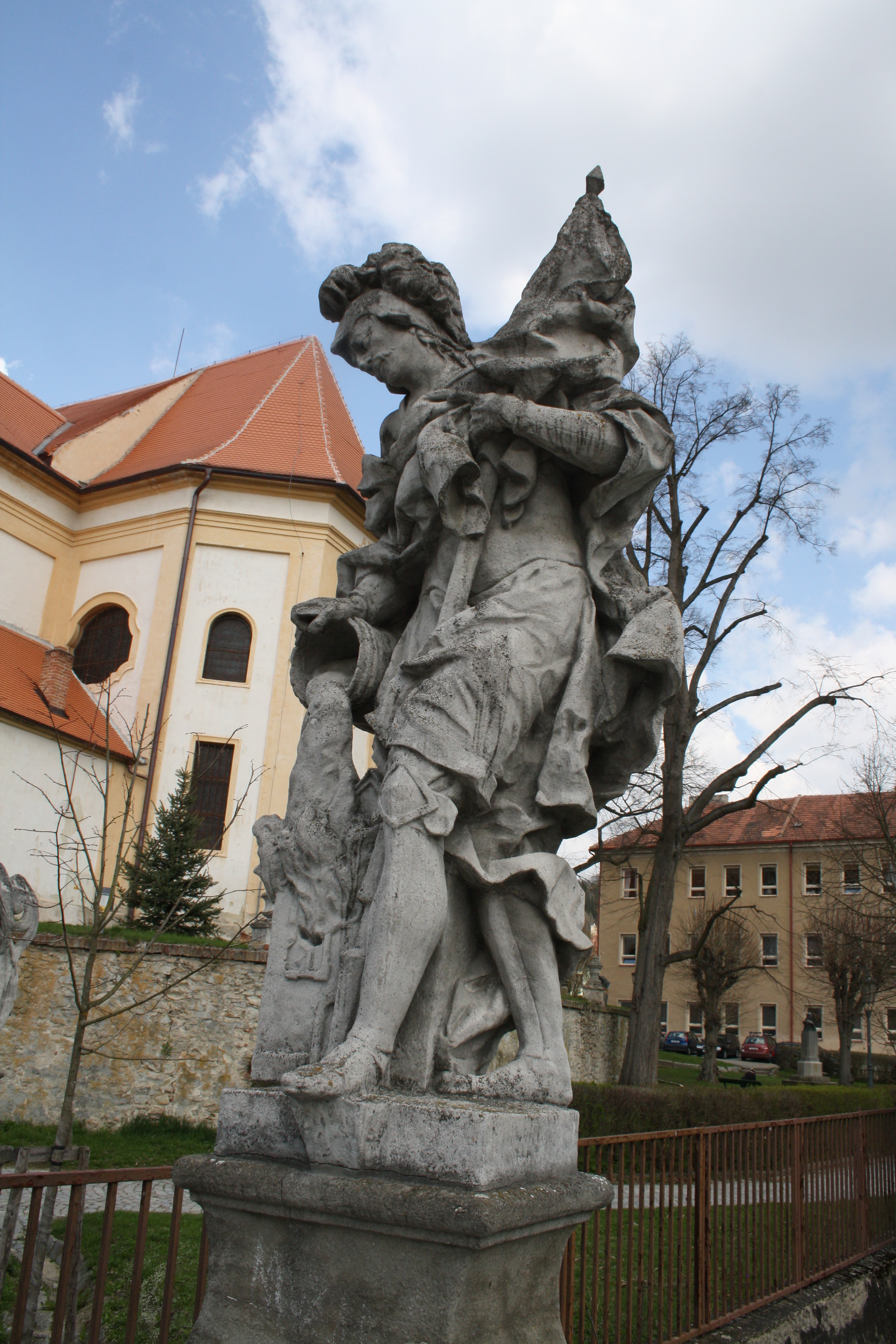
Statue of Saint Florian

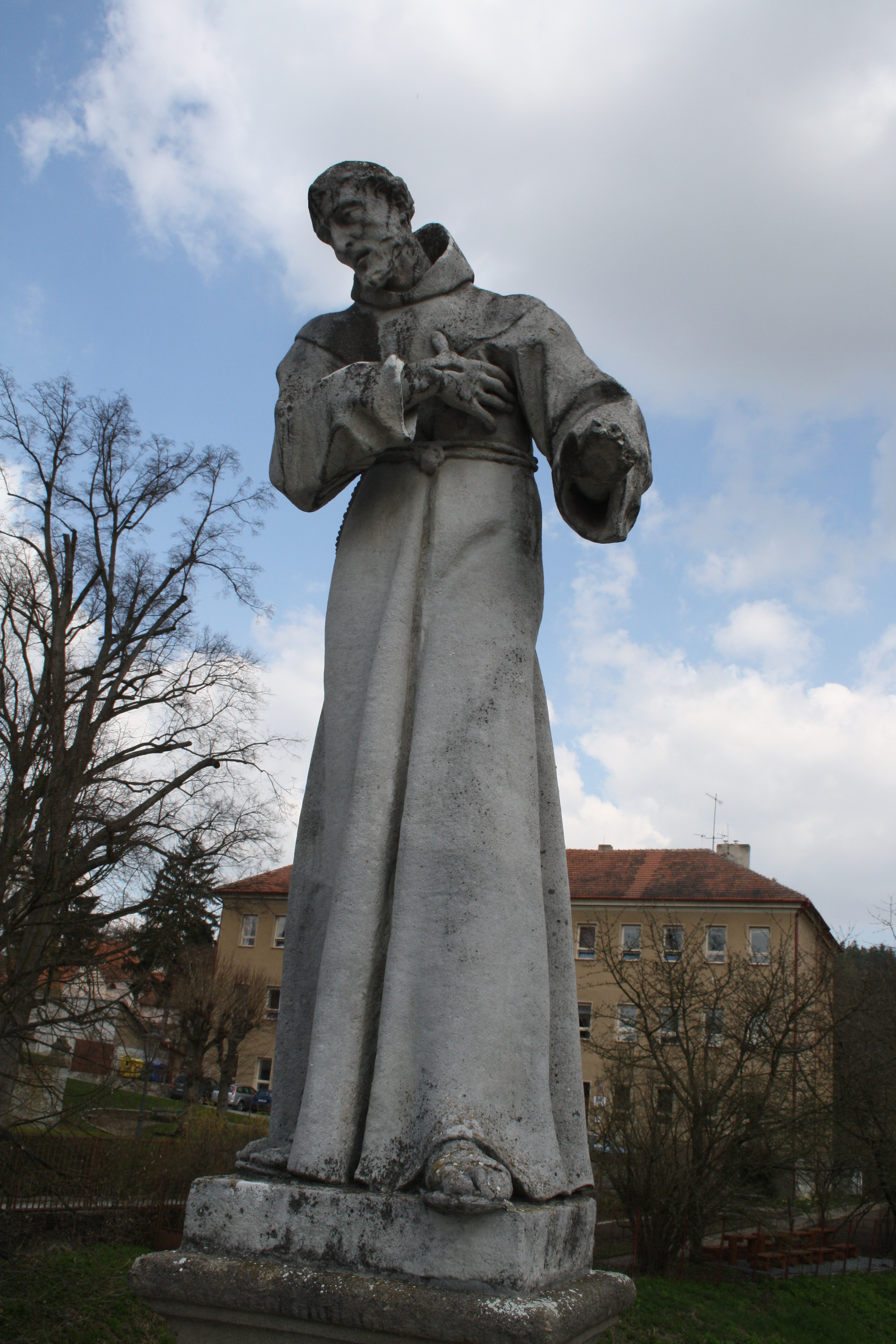
Statue of Saint Francis of Assisi

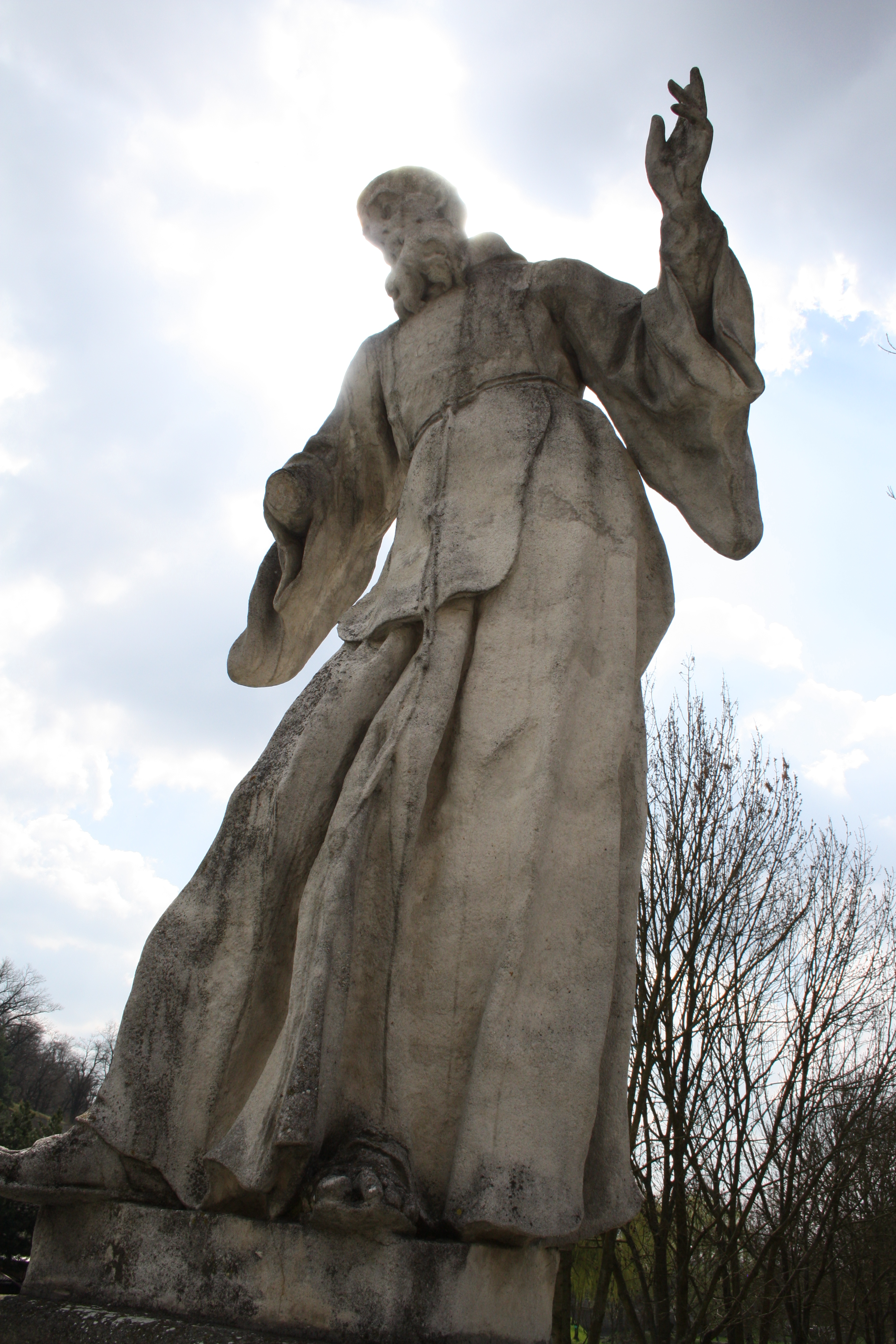
Statue of Saint Francis of Paola

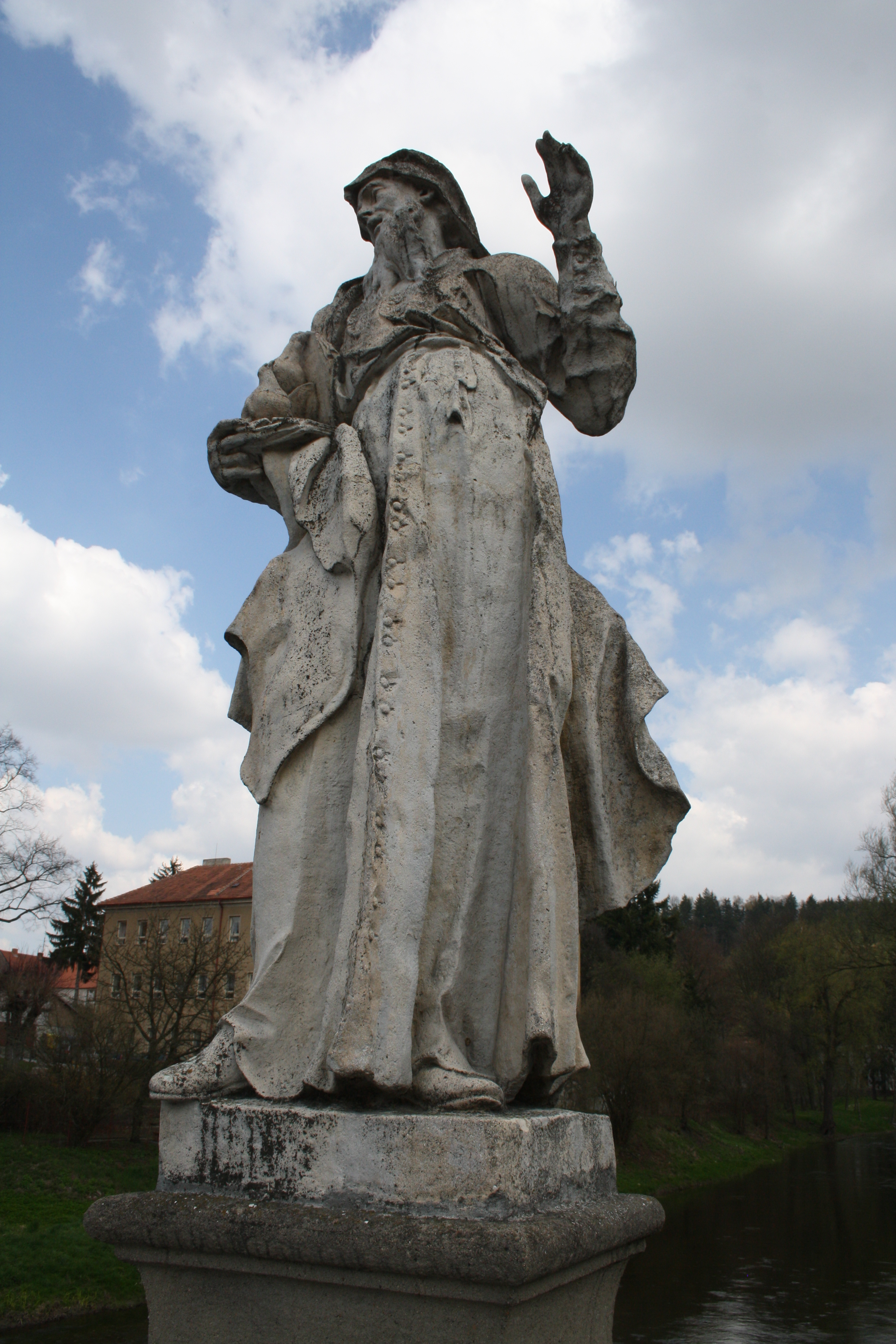
Statue of Saint Joachim

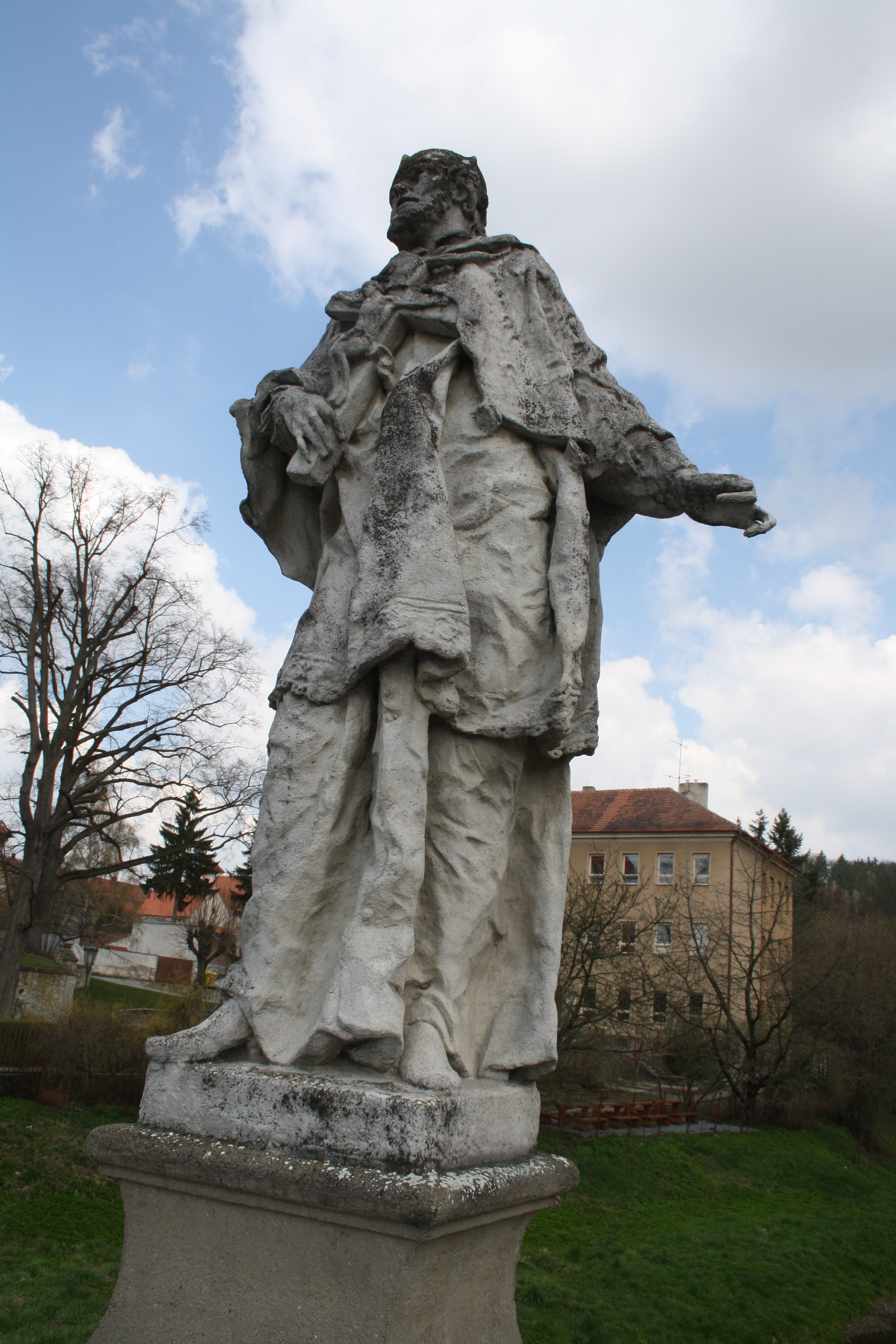
Statue of Saint John of Nepomuk

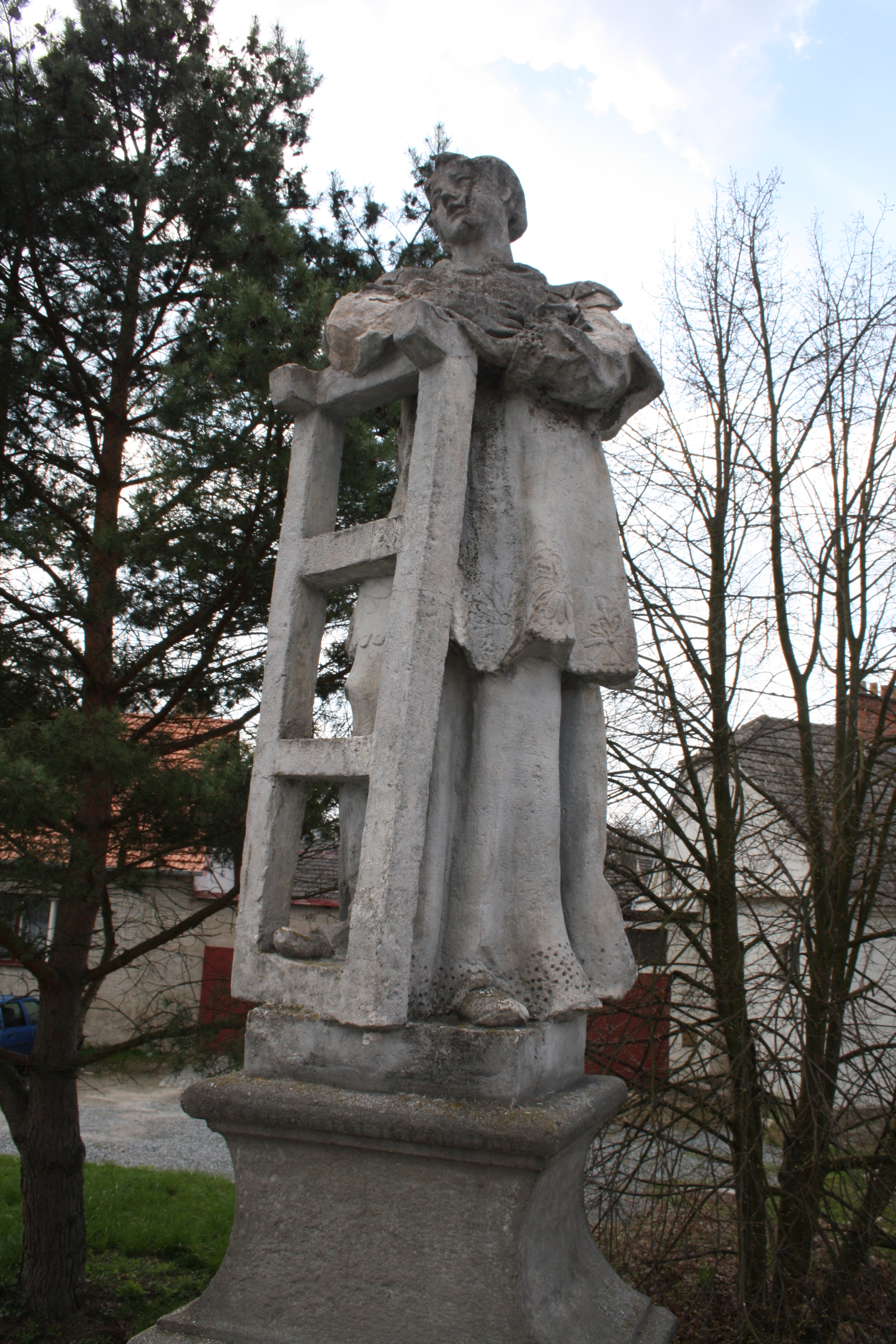
Statue of Saint Lawrence

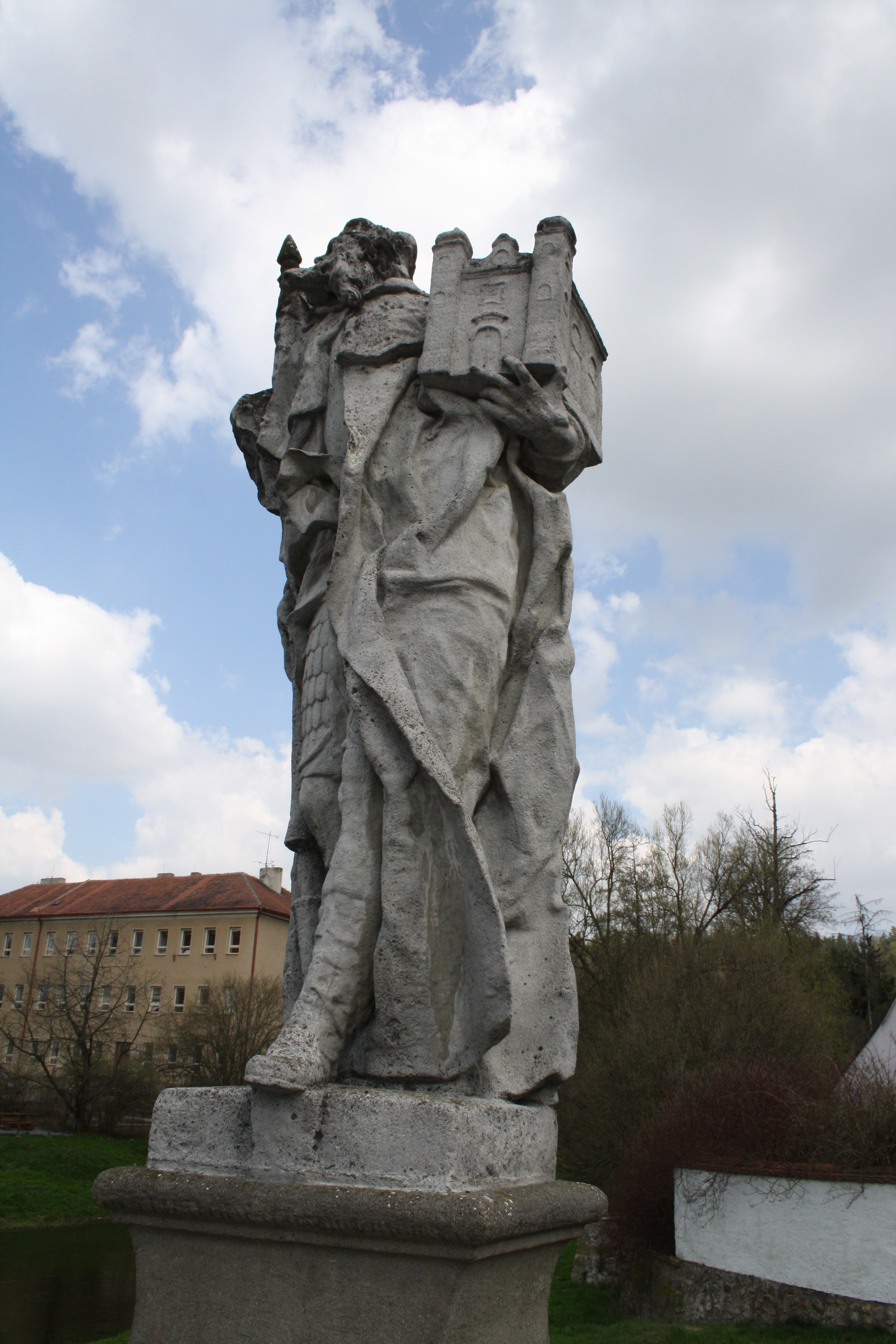
Statue of Saint Leopold

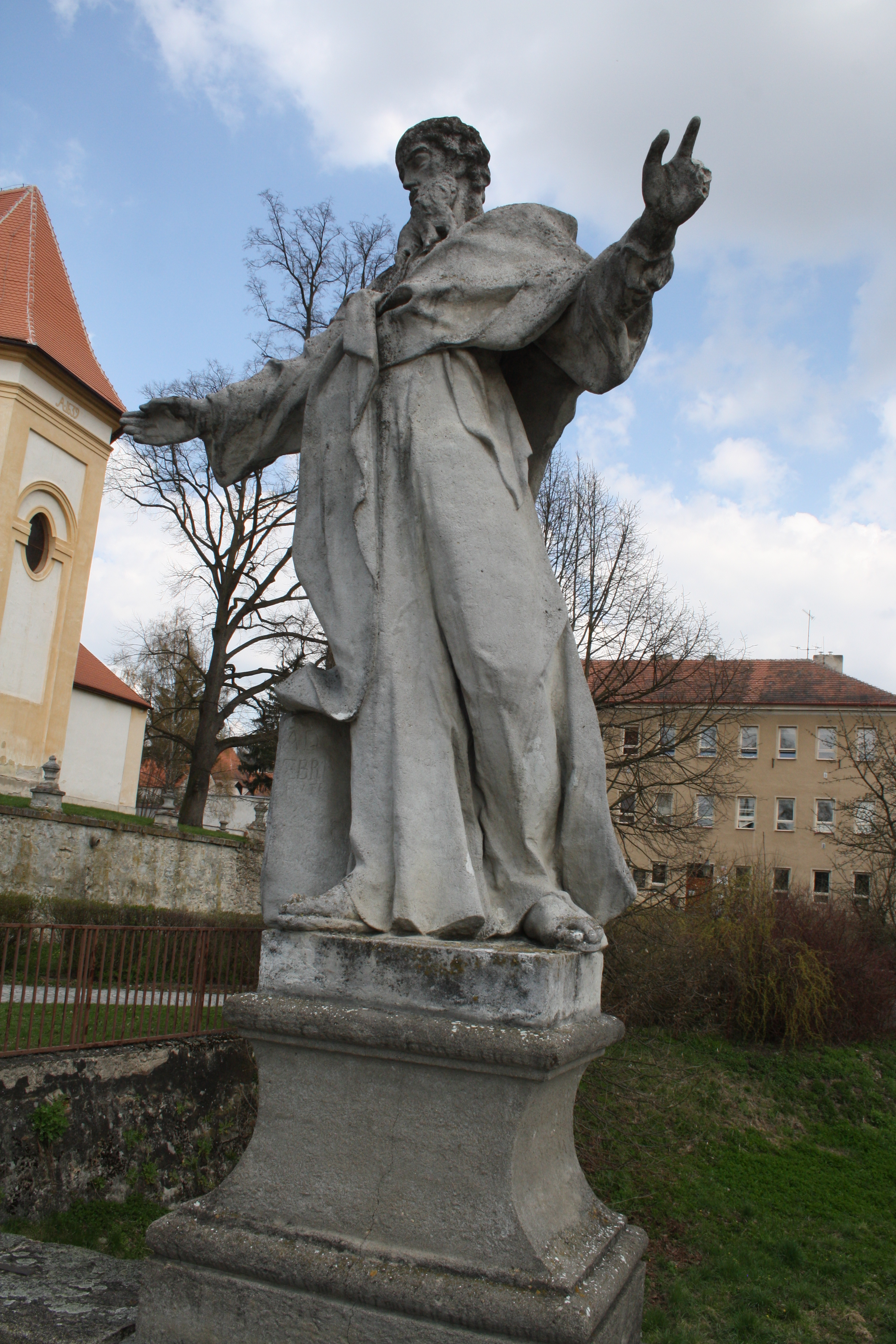
Statue of Saint Paul

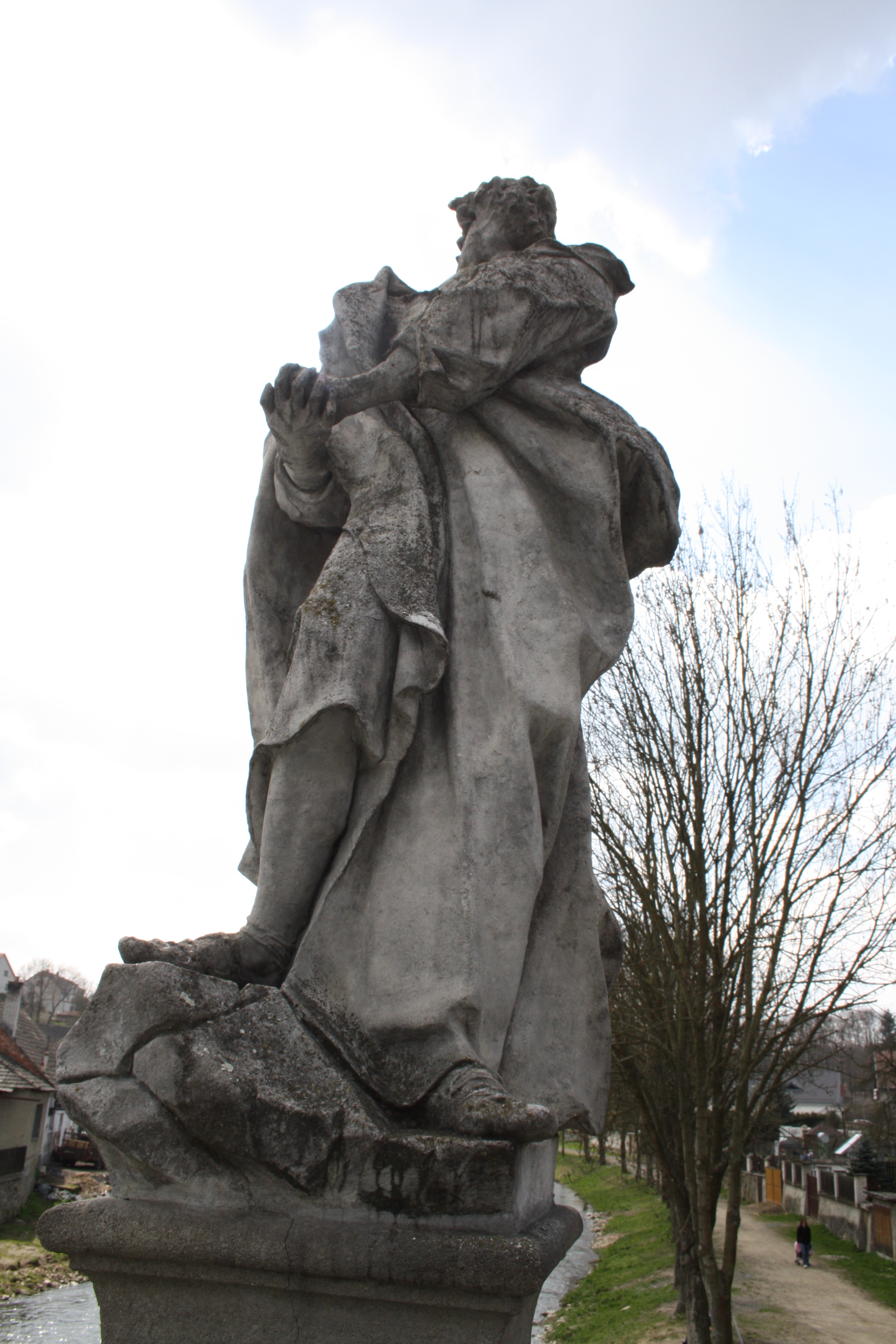
Statue of Saint Peter

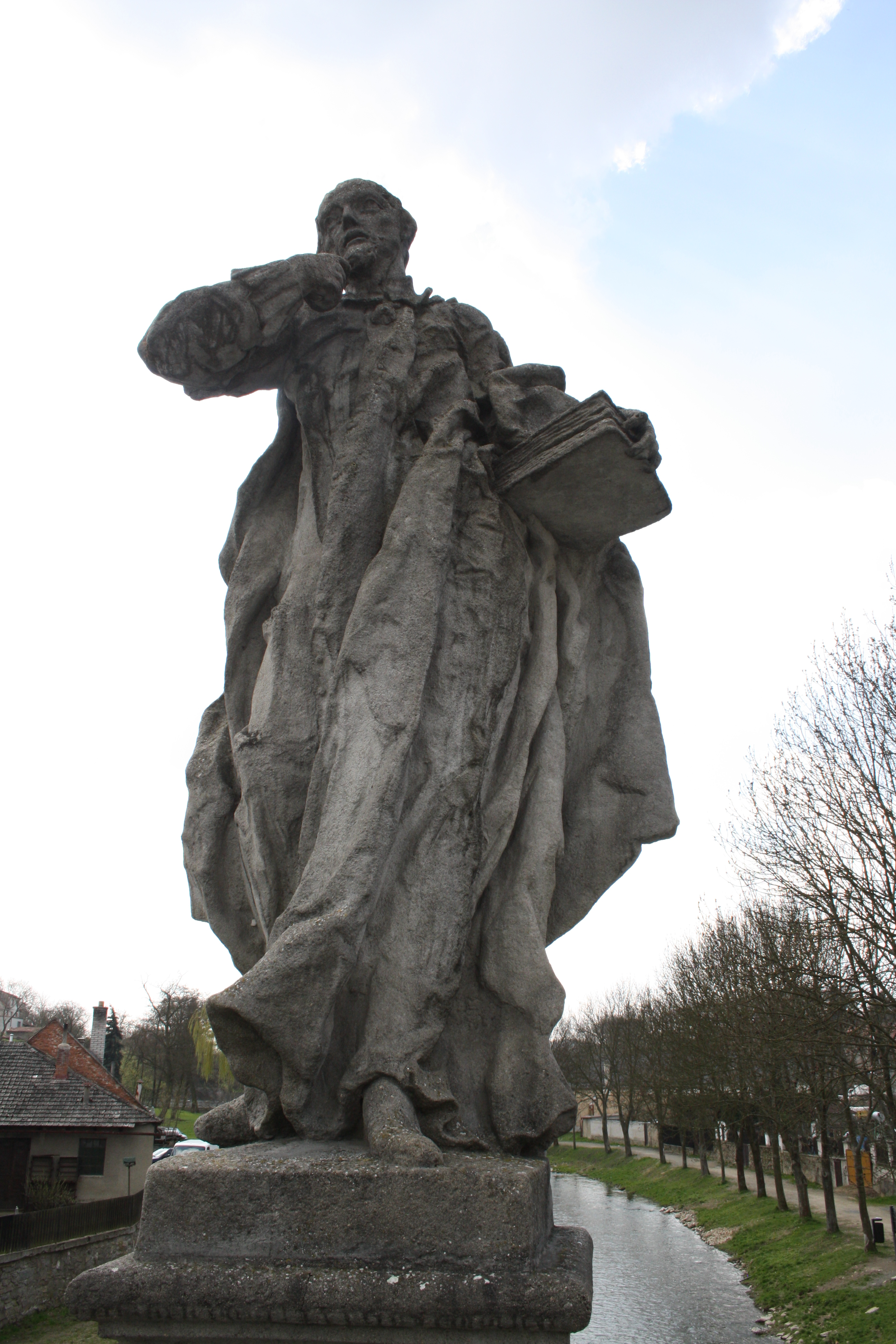
Statue of Saint Philip Neri

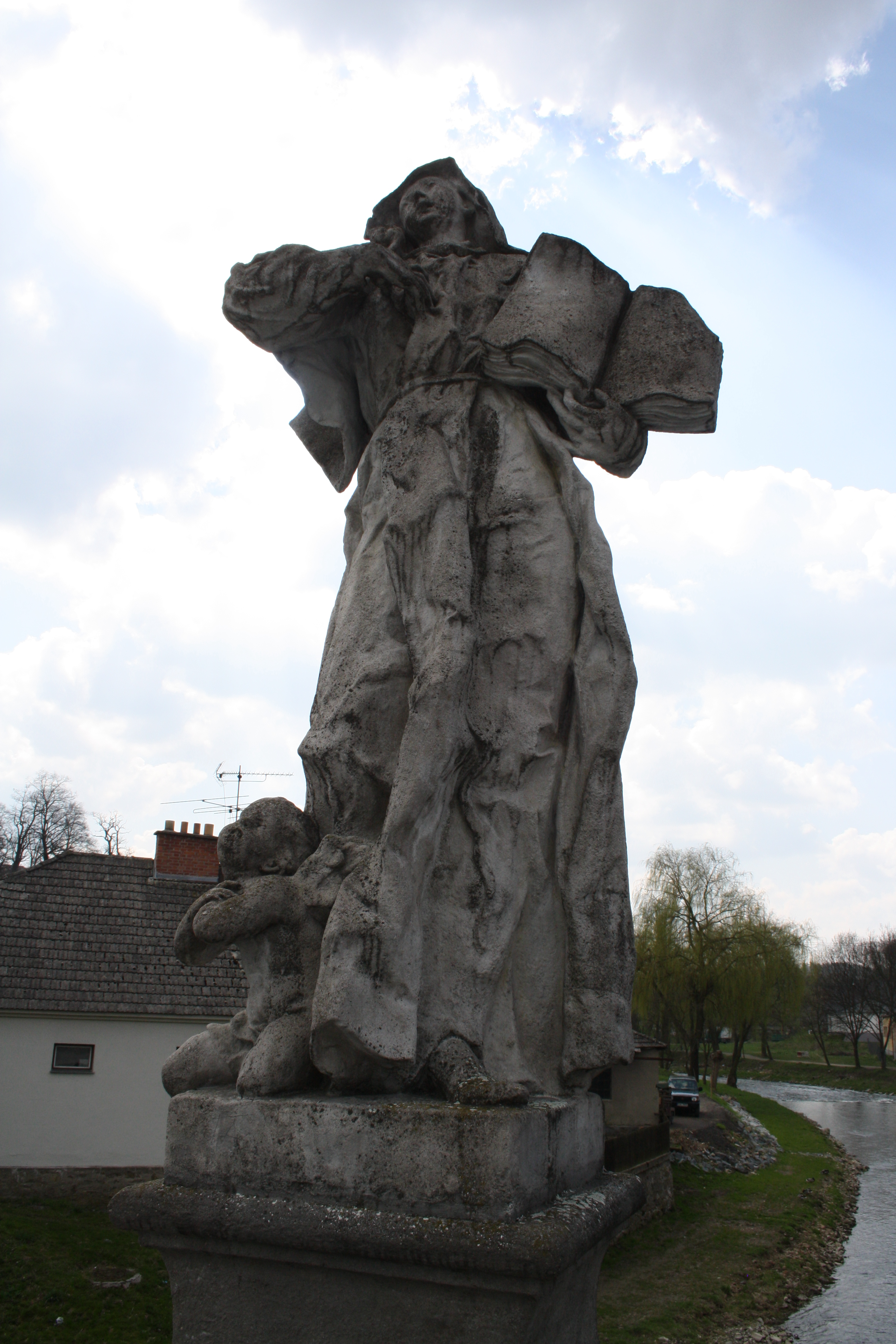
Statue of Saint Theresa of Ávila

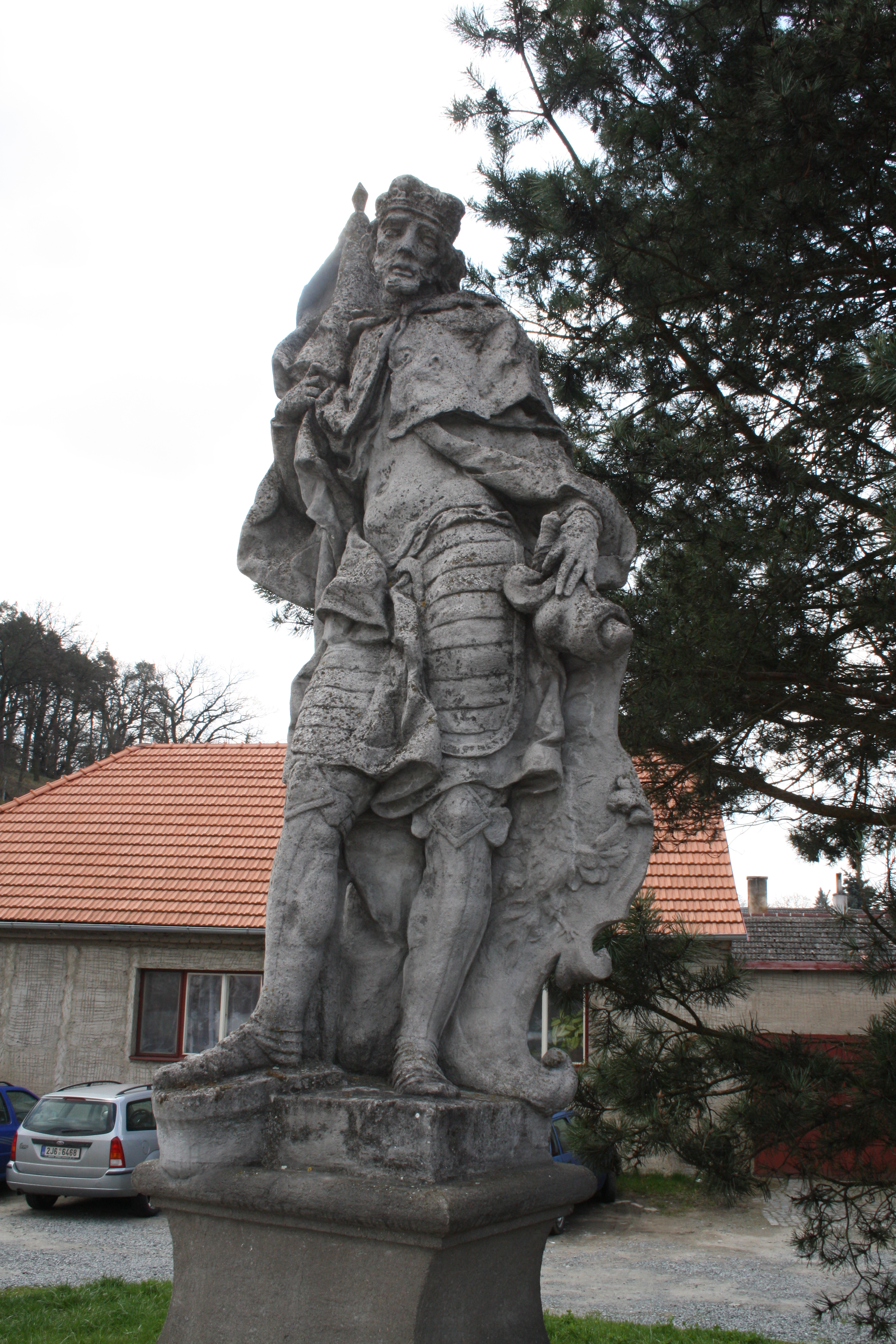
Statue of Saint Wenceslaus
