= Winterhalter =

Winterhalter is a surname. Notable people with the surname include:

- Albert G. Winterhalter (1856–1920), admiral in the United States Navy, commander in chief of the U.S. Asiatic Fleet from 1915 to 1917
- Franz Xaver Winterhalter (1805–1873), German painter and lithographer
- Hermann Winterhalter (1808–1891), German painter, brother of Franz
- Hugo Winterhalter (1909–1973), American arranger and composer

== See also ==
- Winterhalder
