= Náměšť nad Oslavou =

- Town
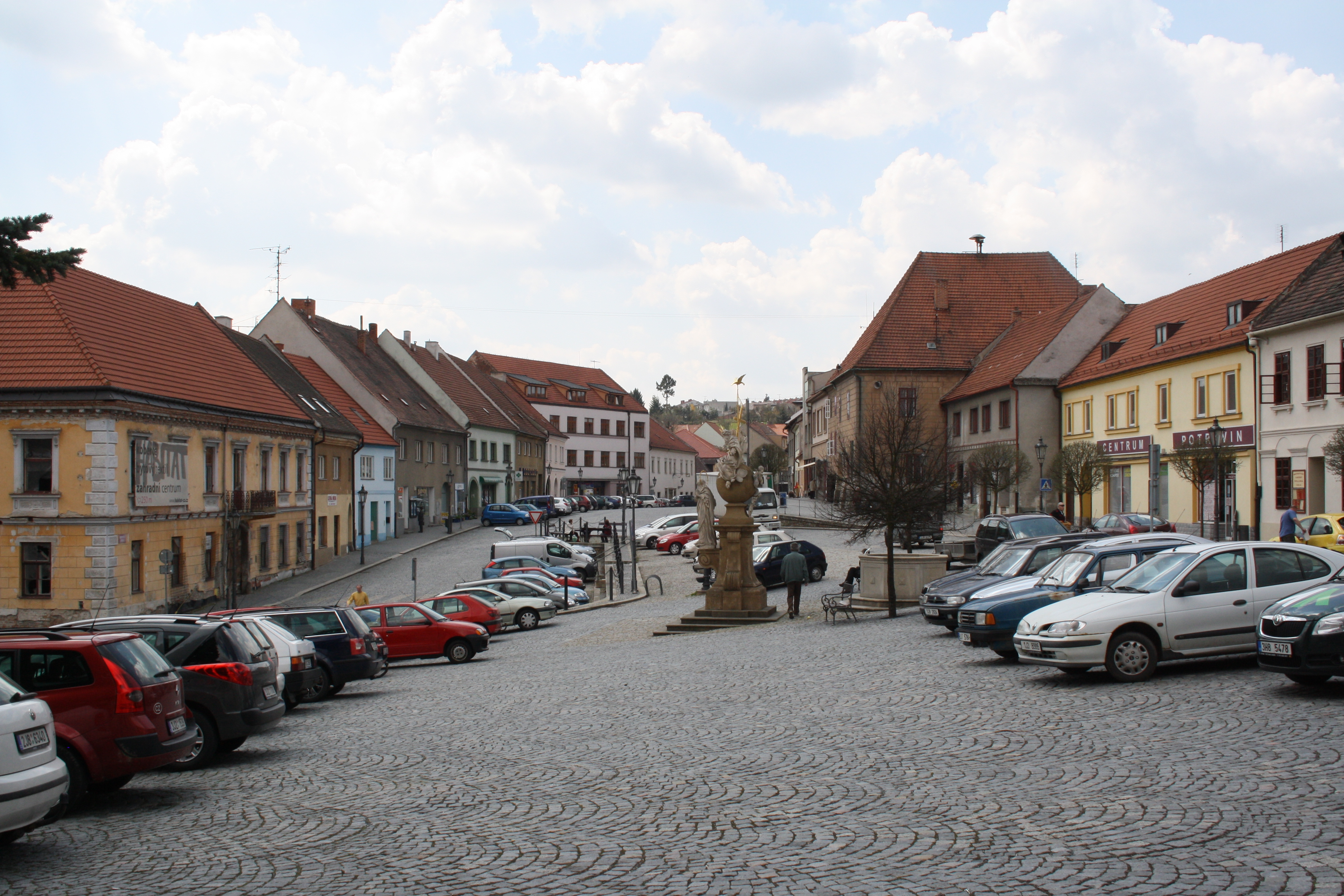
- The square Masarykovo náměstí

- Flag Coat of arms

- Location in the Czech Republic
- Coordinates: 49°12′26″N 16°9′31″E
- Country: Czech Republic
- Region: Vysočina
- District: Třebíč
- First mentioned: 1234

Government
  - Mayor: Jan Kotačka

Area
  - Total: 18.62 km^{2} (7.19 sq mi)
- Elevation: 365 m (1,198 ft)

Population (2026-01-01)
  - Total: 4,738
  - Density: 254.5/km^{2} (659.0/sq mi)
- Time zone: UTC+1 (CET)
  - Summer (DST): UTC+2 (CEST)
- Postal code: 675 71
- Website: www.namestnosl.cz

Náměšť nad Oslavou (Czech pronunciation: [ˈnaːmɲɛʃc ˈnat oslavou]) is a town in Třebíč District in the Vysočina Region of the Czech Republic. It has about 4,700 inhabitants. The town is located on the Oslava River, on the border between the Jevišovice Uplands and Křižanov Highlands.

Náměšť nad Oslavou was founded around 1220 and became a town in 1923. The historic town centre is well preserved and is protected as an urban monument zone.

== Administrative division ==
Náměšť nad Oslavou consists of four municipal parts (in brackets population according to the 2021 census):

- Náměšť nad Oslavou (4,482)
- Jedov (71)
- Otradice (52)
- Zňátky (100)

== Geography ==
Náměšť nad Oslavou is located about 20 kilometres (12 mi) east of Třebíč and 31 km (19 mi) west of Brno. The southern part of the municipal territory with most of the built-up area lies in the Jevišovice Uplands. The northern part lies in the Křižanov Highlands and includes the highest point of Náměšť nad Oslavou at 455 m (1,493 ft) above sea level. The Oslava River flows through the town.

=== Climate ===
Climate data for Náměšť nad Oslavou (1991–2020)
Month	Jan	Feb	Mar	Apr	May	Jun	Jul	Aug	Sep	Oct	Nov	Dec	Year
Record high °C (°F)	13.7 (56.7)	15.6 (60.1)	20.5 (68.9)	27.1 (80.8)	31.0 (87.8)	34.8 (94.6)	35.0 (95.0)	36.4 (97.5)	30.6 (87.1)	25.4 (77.7)	17.7 (63.9)	12.6 (54.7)	36.4 (97.5)
Mean daily maximum °C (°F)	0.9 (33.6)	3.1 (37.6)	7.8 (46.0)	13.9 (57.0)	18.3 (64.9)	22.1 (71.8)	24.5 (76.1)	24.5 (76.1)	18.6 (65.5)	12.2 (54.0)	6.0 (42.8)	1.4 (34.5)	12.8 (55.0)
Daily mean °C (°F)	−1.7 (28.9)	−0.2 (31.6)	3.6 (38.5)	9.1 (48.4)	13.6 (56.5)	17.3 (63.1)	19.2 (66.6)	19.0 (66.2)	13.9 (57.0)	8.5 (47.3)	3.5 (38.3)	−0.8 (30.6)	8.7 (47.7)
Mean daily minimum °C (°F)	−4.3 (24.3)	−3.3 (26.1)	0.1 (32.2)	4.5 (40.1)	8.9 (48.0)	12.2 (54.0)	14.1 (57.4)	14.1 (57.4)	9.9 (49.8)	5.5 (41.9)	1.2 (34.2)	−3.0 (26.6)	5.0 (41.0)
Record low °C (°F)	−20.6 (−5.1)	−19.2 (−2.6)	−15.4 (4.3)	−7.4 (18.7)	−1.5 (29.3)	0.5 (32.9)	5.4 (41.7)	3.7 (38.7)	0.9 (33.6)	−6.6 (20.1)	−10.6 (12.9)	−20.2 (−4.4)	−20.6 (−5.1)
Average precipitation mm (inches)	21.7 (0.85)	18.0 (0.71)	29.9 (1.18)	29.0 (1.14)	61.5 (2.42)	75.2 (2.96)	68.3 (2.69)	62.0 (2.44)	47.3 (1.86)	33.2 (1.31)	30.6 (1.20)	26.0 (1.02)	502.9 (19.80)
Average precipitation days (≥ 1.0 mm)	5.5	5.0	5.9	5.3	8.2	7.9	8.4	7.0	6.1	6.3	6.6	6.4	78.6
Mean monthly sunshine hours	54.5	85.4	135.5	200.1	229.4	237.4	250.3	245.0	171.5	111.5	51.1	41.7	1,813.5
Source: NOAA

== History ==
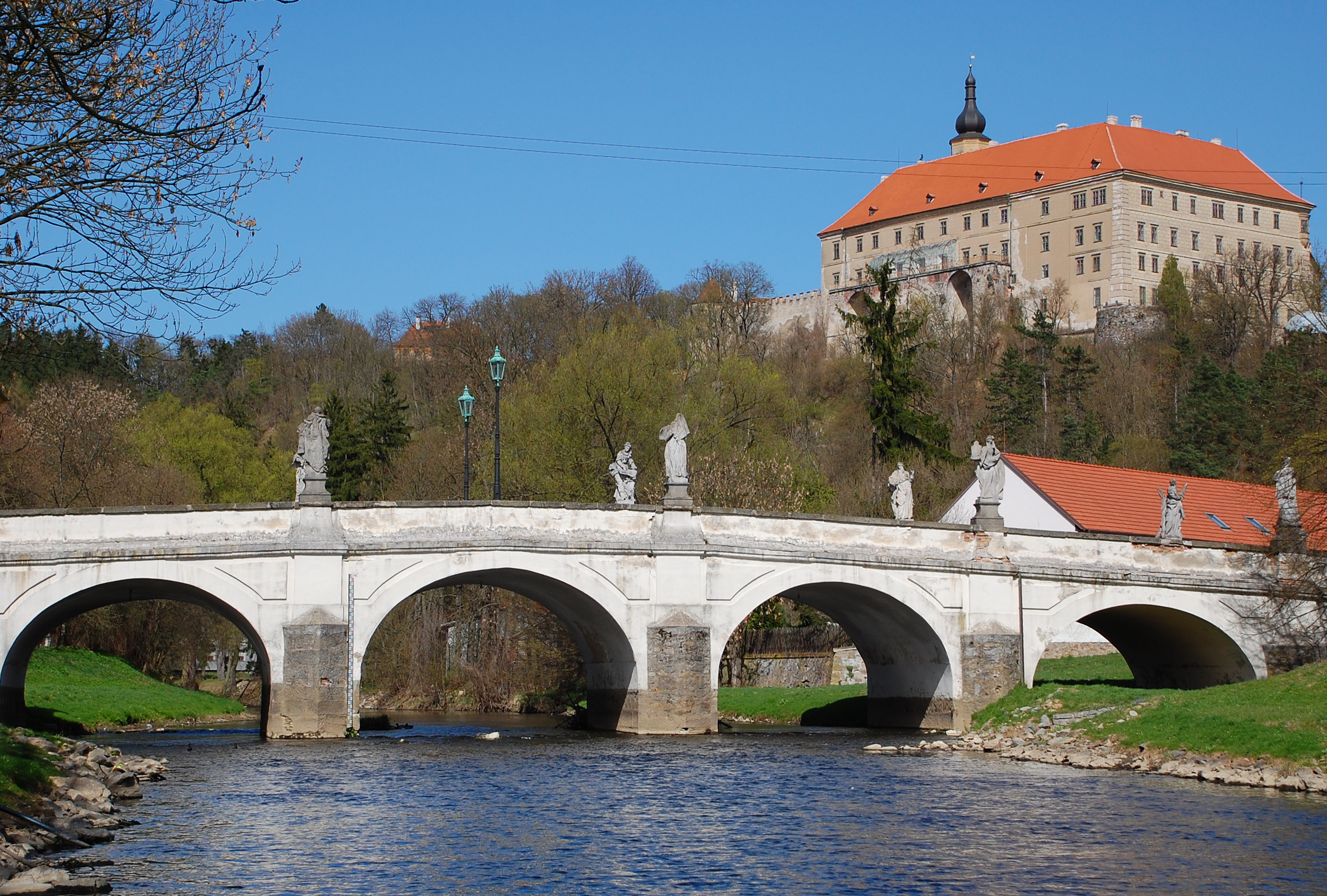
Baroque bridge and the castle

Náměšť was founded around 1220. The first written mention of Náměšť is from 1234, when the castle was owned by the Lords of Lomnice. In the 14th and 15th centuries, Náměšť was frequently conquered and destroyed by various armies. In 1304, Náměšť was destroyed by Cumans, in 1408 by the army of Lacko of Kravaře, and during the Hussite Wars by the armies of Sigismund and Albert II.

From 1481 to 1563, Náměšť was owned again by the Lords of Lomnice. In 1563, it was acquired by the Zierotin family. Jan the Elder of Zierotin had replaced the old Gothic castle with a new large Renaissance residence. Jan's successor Karl the Elder of Zierotin sold the estate to Albrecht of Wallenstein in 1628, who immediately sold it to the House of Werdenberg. The Werdenberg family owned it until 1733.

From 1752 until the abolition of manorialism, Náměšť was in the possession of the Haugwitz family. The railway was built in 1866. In 1923, Náměšť nad Oslavou was promoted to a town.

== Demographics ==
Historical population

Year	Pop.	±%
1869	2,351	—
1880	2,373	+0.9%
1890	2,410	+1.6%
1900	2,269	−5.9%
1910	2,495	+10.0%

Year	Pop.	±%
1921	2,480	−0.6%
1930	2,666	+7.5%
1950	2,793	+4.8%
1961	3,939	+41.0%
1970	4,493	+14.1%

Year	Pop.	±%
1980	4,992	+11.1%
1991	5,115	+2.5%
2001	5,246	+2.6%
2011	4,996	−4.8%
2021	4,705	−5.8%

Source: Censuses

== Transport ==
The I/23 road (the section from Třebíč to Rosice) runs through the municipality.

Náměšť nad Oslavou is located on the railway line Brno–Plzeň via Třebíč and České Budějovice.

== Culture ==
Since 1986, Náměšť nad Oslavou has been hosting the folk music festival Folkové prázdniny ('folk holidays').

== Sights ==
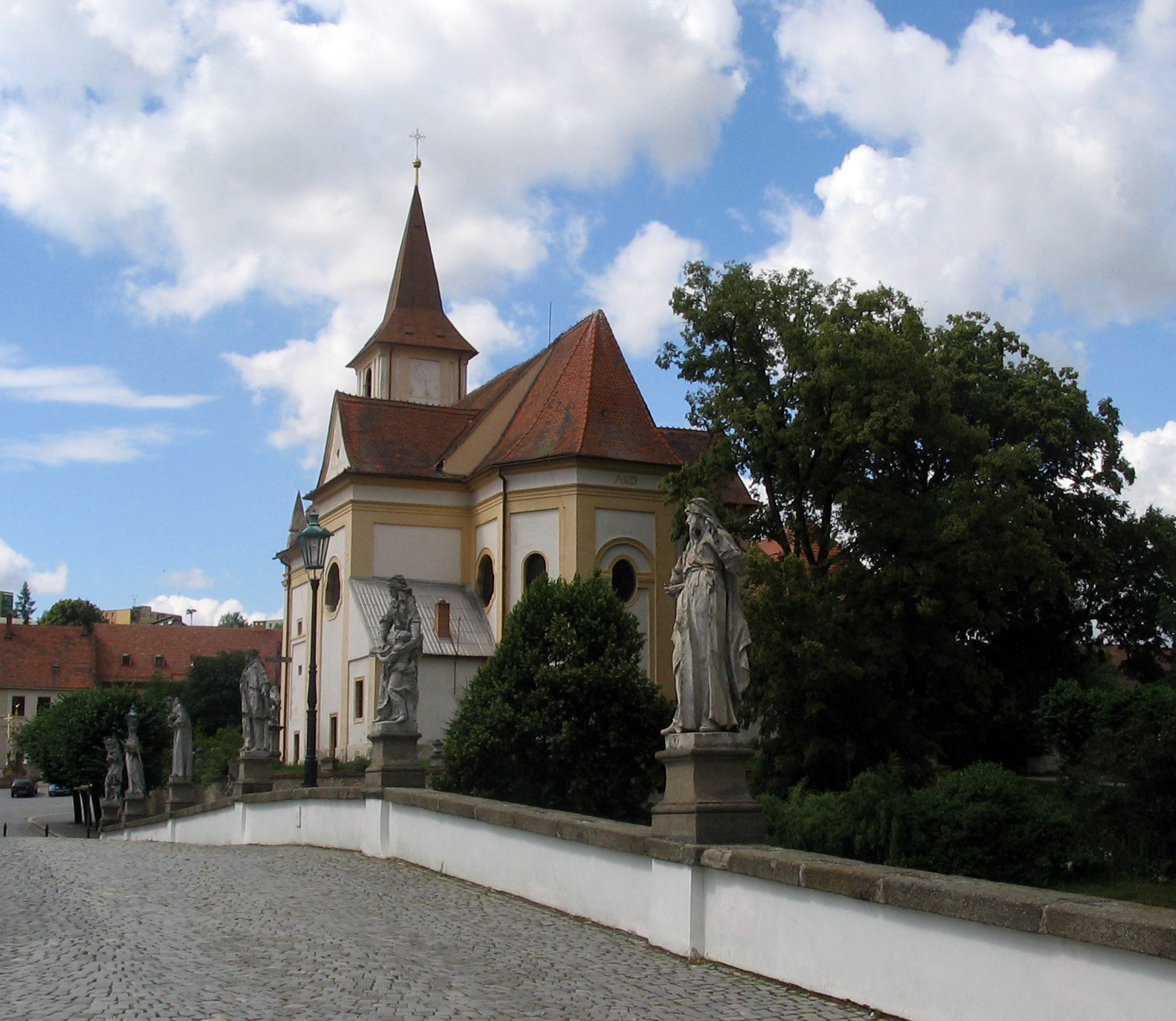
Church of Saint John the Baptist

Náměšť nad Oslavou is known for its Baroque bridge. It was built in 1737 and is decorated by twenty sculptures. It has the richest sculptural decoration in Moravia and the second richest in the country after the Charles Bridge in Prague.

The most important monument and the main landmark of the town is the Náměšť nad Oslavou Castle, which is protected as a national cultural monument. It is located on a hilltop above the town. It was built in 1572–1579. Today it is open to the public. It includes a castle park with valuable trees.

The Church of Saint John the Baptist on the town square was built in 1639. It replaced an old Romanesque structure. The neighbouring complex of the rectory with Chapel of Saint Anne was built in the Baroque style in 1740–1745.

== Notable people ==
- František Antonín Míča (1696–1744), conductor and composer
- Karel František Koch (1890–1981), medical doctor, known for rescuing Jews during the Holocaust
- Michael Rabušic (born 1989), footballer

== Twin towns – sister cities ==
Náměšť nad Oslavou is twinned with:

- Medzilaborce, Slovakia
