= Johann Michael Winterhalder =

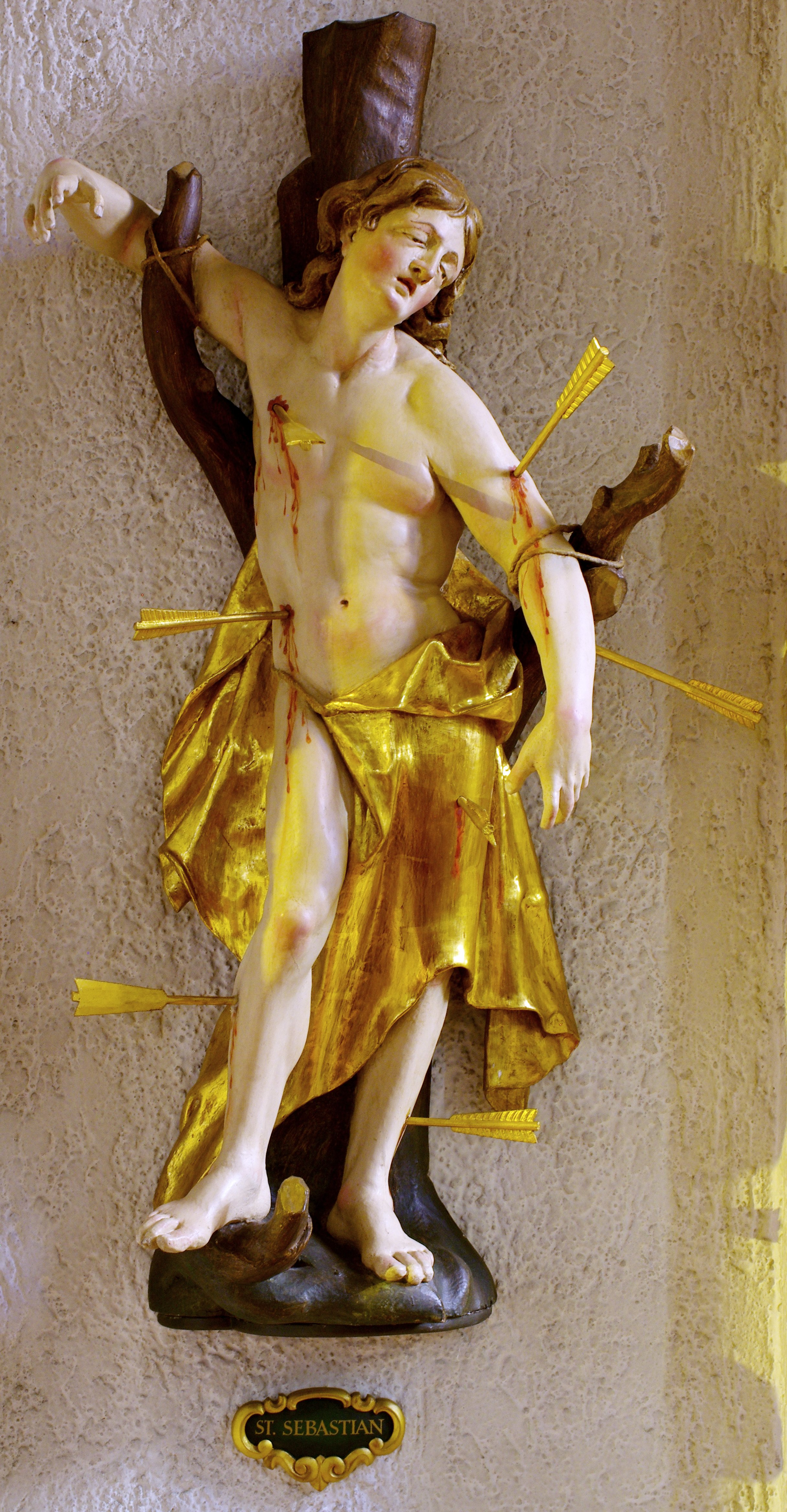
St. Sebastian; Church of St. Martin

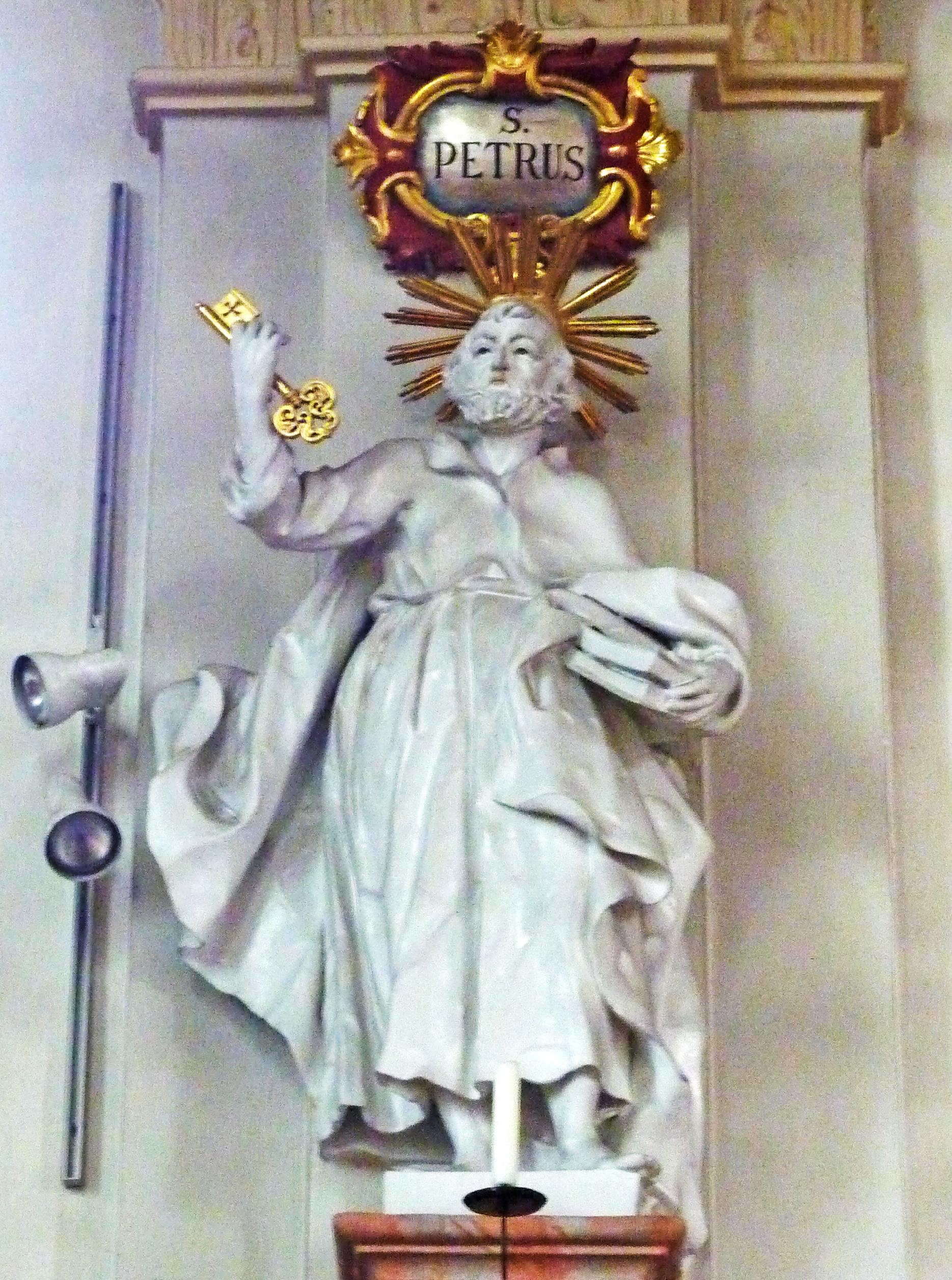
St. Peter; Parish church at St. Margarethe Monastery, Waldkirch (c. 1740)

Johann Michael Winterhalder (7 September 1706, Vöhrenbach – 12 May 1759, Vöhrenbach) was a German artist in the Baroque style; from the Winterhalder family of sculptors.

== Life and work ==
He was one of three sons born to the sculptor, Adam Winterhalder. His training took place in his father's workshop, as did that of his older brothers, Anton (1699–1758) and Josef. In 1725, together with one of his father's apprentices, Matthias Faller, he set out as a wandering journeyman. After spending some time in Gengenbach with his cousin, Philipp, who was ill, they continued through Colmar, Augsburg and Munich, to Prague and Vienna.

In Vienna he made contact with the sculptor, Georg Raphael Donner, which would be significant to his career. From 1728 to 1730, he was a student at the Academy of Fine Arts; following Josef, who had attended the Academy the two years prior. From 1731 to 1732, all three brothers worked at the Hradisko Monastery, and at the pilgrimage church in Svatý Kopeček (today part of Olomouc).

This was to be their last joint project. Anton and Josef remained in Moravia. In 1733, Johann returned home to assist his overworked, eighty-year-old father. A year later, on the occasion of his marriage to Maria Scherzinger (1713–1749), the workshop became his. They had six children, two of whom, Josef and Anton (1745–1805), also became sculptors. Anton inherited the workshop when Johann died.

His best known projects include one that had been commissioned from his father in 1715, but never completed; twelve figures for the side altars at the Vöhrenbach parish Church of St. Martin. It was the first project he undertook after returning home. The original church was demolished in the 1950s, and the figures were loaned out or kept in an attic until the 1970s, when they were restored in the new church.

Between 1738 and 1741, he created figures of the Twelve Apostles and St. Paul for the high altar in the new parish church at St. Margarethe Monastery. Later, the altar was remodeled to reflect the popular Rococo style, but his figures were left intact. They are among the few sculptures he created in stucco, rather than wood.
