= Josef Winterhalder the Younger =

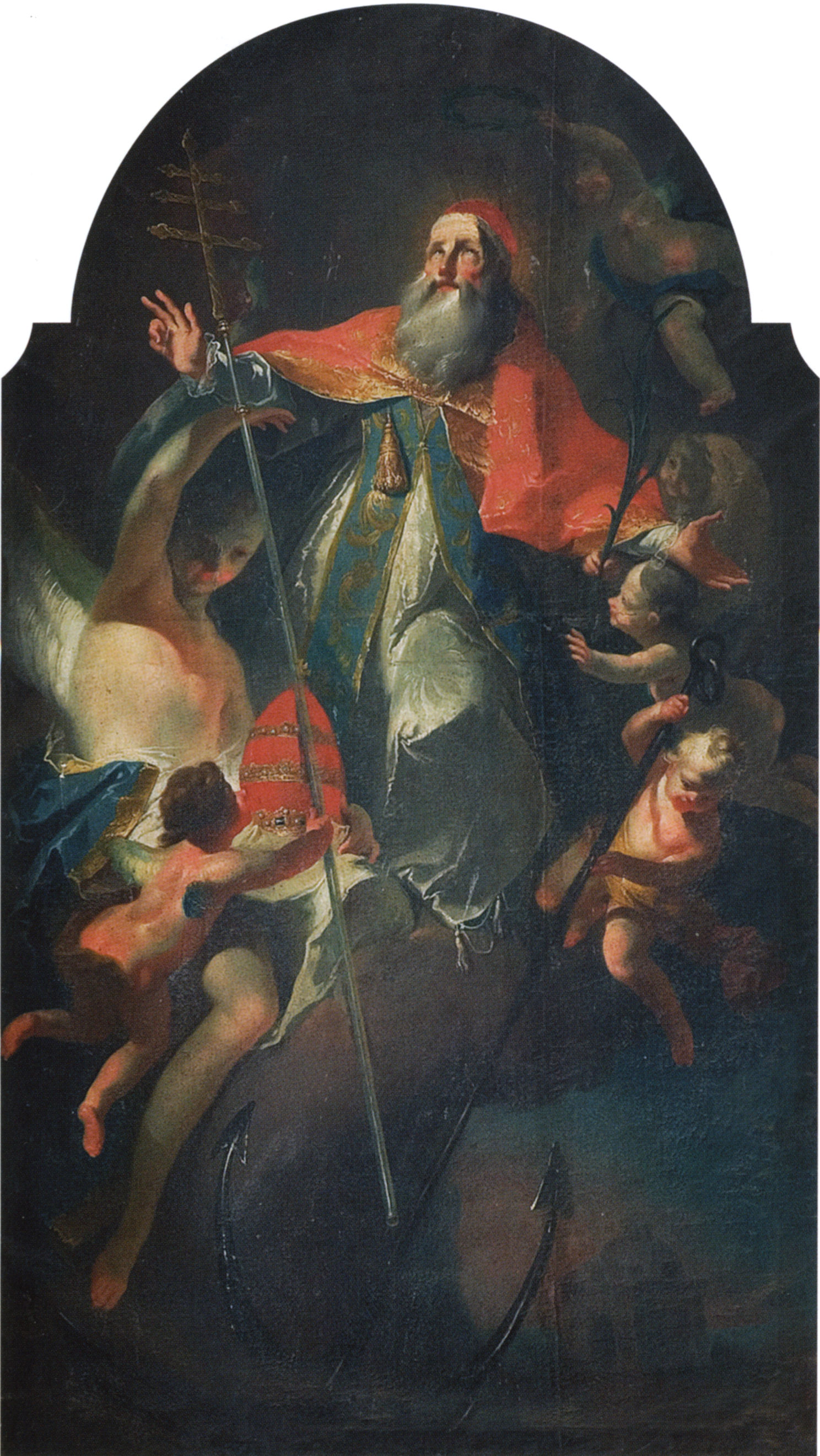
The Apotheosis of Saint Clement (c. 1770)

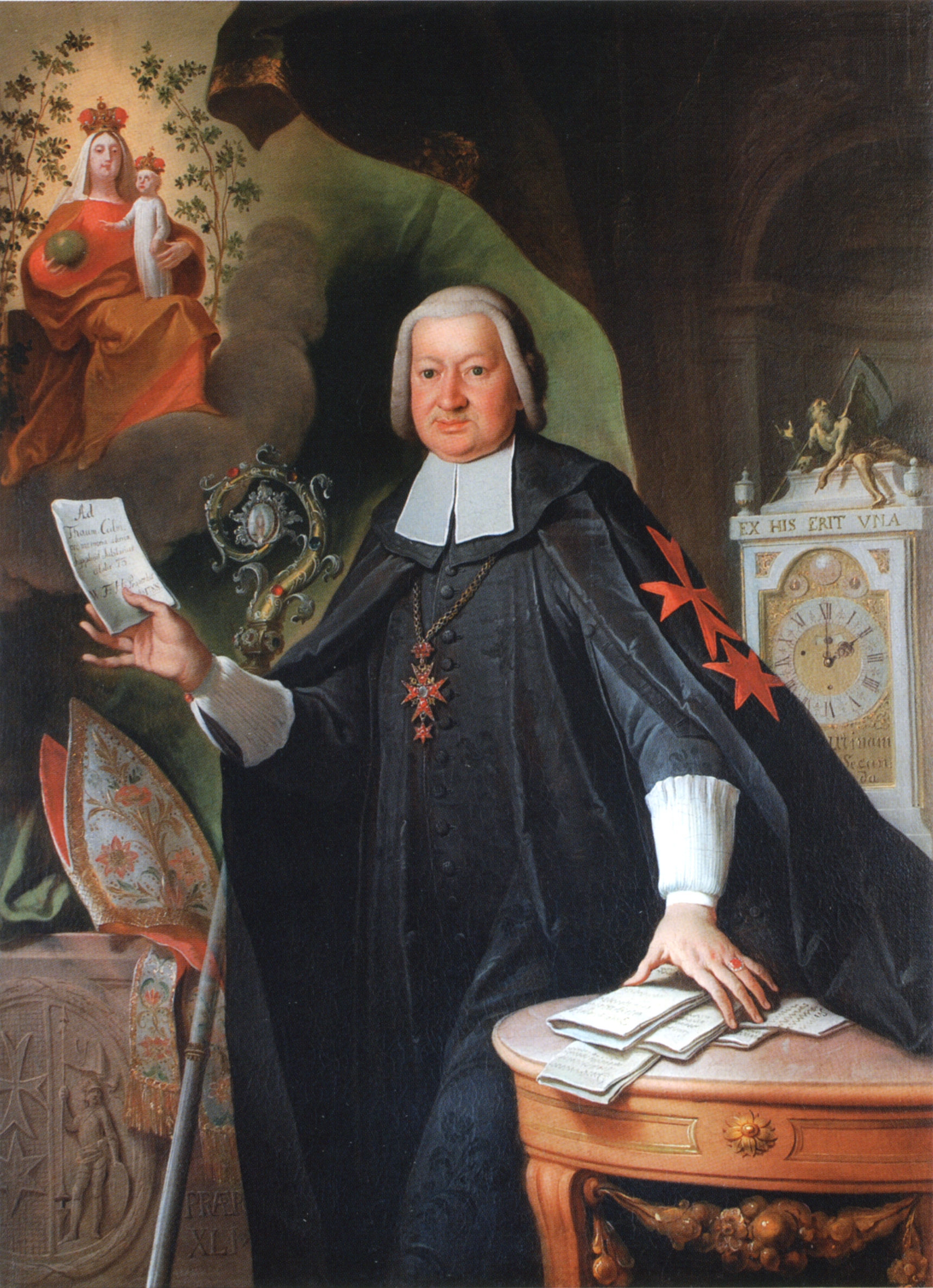
Wenzel Friedrich Hlava, Provost of the Knights of the Cross with the Red Star (1788)

Josef Winterhalder the Younger (25 January 1743 – 17 January 1807) was a German-Bohemian painter belonging to the fourth generation of painters and sculptors in the Winterhalder family. He worked in Moravia, Lower Austria and Hungary.

== Life ==
Josef Winterhalder was born on 25 January 1743 in Vöhrenbach. He was one of six children born to the sculptor Johann Michael Winterhalder. After his mother's death in 1753, he and two of his siblings were sent to live in Olomouc with their uncle, Josef (now referred to as Josef Winterhalder the Elder) who formally adopted them. He introduced his nephew to his colleagues, Paul Troger and Franz Anton Maulbertsch and he was an assistant in the latter's workshop from 1763 to 1768. His first mature work in his own style is an apotheosis of Saint Clement at the parish church in Horní Břečkov, completed in c. 1770.

After marrying and settling in Znojmo, he worked prolifically throughout the area until the early 1780s, when Emperor Joseph II suppressed the monasteries and ordered a reduction in the ornamentation of churches; part of a general program of religious modernization.

These actions had a serious effect on Winterhalder's livelihood, but he was able to find patronage from the Moravian nobility, decorating several of their mansions with trompe-l'œil ornaments and the like. This period includes his only portrait. In 1796, János Szily, the Bishop of Szombathely, wanted murals for his cathedral. Maulbertsch was the Bishop's first choice, but he was ill (terminally so, as it turned out), so the commission went to Winterhalder. This restored his career, to some extent. The murals were lost during World War II.

Around 1800, he wrote Moravian artists in Znojmo and the surroundings, a compendium of artworks and artists (with critical commentary and biographies). He also listed his own works in the order of their importance (rating those from the period of suppression at the bottom), and mused about the course of his life. His last known works were in 1805, at a library belonging to the Premonstratensian order in Geras.

He died on 17 January 1807 in Znojmo.
