= Josef Winterhalder the Elder =

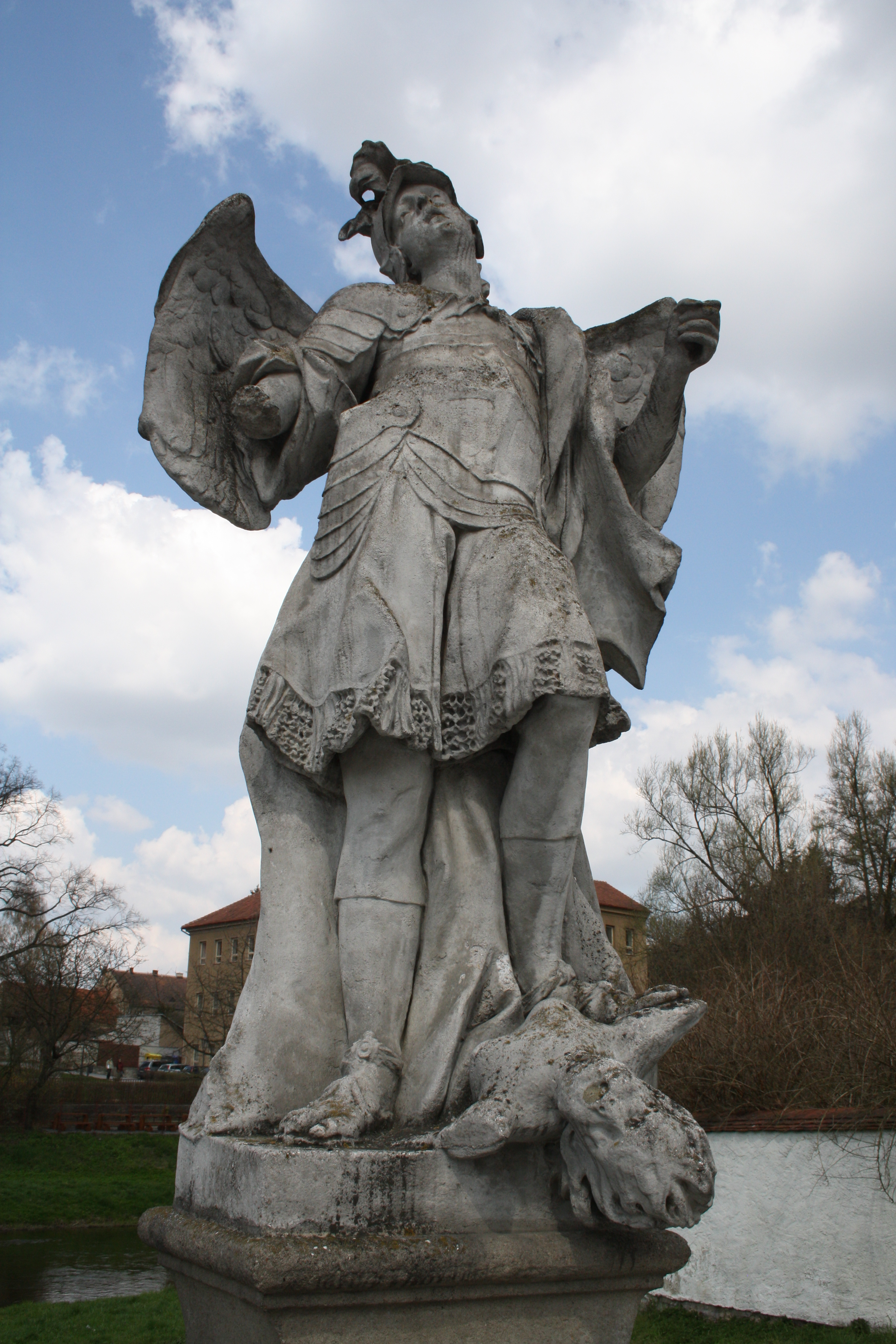
The Archangel Michael at the bridge in Náměšť nad Oslavou

Josef Winterhalder the Elder (10 January 1702, Vöhrenbach – 25 December 1769, Vienna) was a German sculptor. His brothers, Anton (1699–1758) and Johann, also became sculptors.

== Biography ==
After an apprenticeship with his father, the sculptor Adam Winterhalder, he spent a brief time in Munich then, from 1728 to 1730, completed his studies at the Academy of Fine Arts, Vienna, where he was taught by Paul Troger, among others. He then went to Dresden, to study the works of Balthasar Permoser. Between 1730 and 1732, he and his brothers worked at the Hradisko Monastery and at the pilgrimage church in Svatý Kopeček (today part of Olomouc). He and Anton remained in Moravia when Johann returned home in 1733.

In 1736, he was one of three sculptors chosen to create the decorations on the ramp of the Dominican church in Brno. The following year, he began creating twenty sandstone figures of saints and angels for the Náměšť nad Oslavou bridge, commissioned by the Enckevort family.

In 1747, records indicate that he created four stucco altars for the monastery church at Uherský Brod. Sometime in the early 1750s, he moved to Znojmo. In 1753, when Johann's wife Maria died, Josef adopted three of their children, including Josef; now known as "The Younger" to distinguish him from his uncle.

His last known work was in 1761, when he submitted a design for the high altar at St. Thomas Church in Brno. The final work was actually executed by the sculptor, Jakob Schertz. Some later drawings have also been preserved.

== Sources ==
- Constantin von Wurzbach: "Winterhalter, Joseph." In: Biographisches Lexikon des Kaiserthums Oesterreich (Biographical Lexicon of the Empire of Austria). Part 57 Kaiserlich-königliche Hof- und Staatsdruckerei, Vienna 1889, p. 84–87 (digitalised).
- Hermann Arthur Lier (1898). "Winterhalter, Joseph". Allgemeine Deutsche Biographie (in German). Vol. 43. Leipzig: Duncker & Humblot. pp. 499–500.
- Edmund Wilhelm Braun: "Winterhalder, Josef I". In: Hans Vollmer (Ed.): Allgemeines Lexikon der Bildenden Künstler von der Antike bis zur Gegenwart, Vol.36: Wilhelmy–Zyzywi. E. A. Seemann, Leipzig 1947, pp.84–86
- Josef Matzke: Olmützer Bildhauer der Barockzeit. Quellenverlag V. Diwisch, Steinheim/Main 1973.
- Lubomír Slaviček (Hrsg.): Josef Winterhalder der Jüngere (1743 Vöhrenbach – 1807 Znojmo), Maulbertschs bester Schüler. Museum Langenargen am Bodensee, Langenargen 2009. ISBN 978-3-00-027324-7
