= Southern Black Forest Nature Park =

Coordinates: 47.8604°N 8.0347°E

Southern Black Forest Nature Park (Naturpark Südschwarzwald)
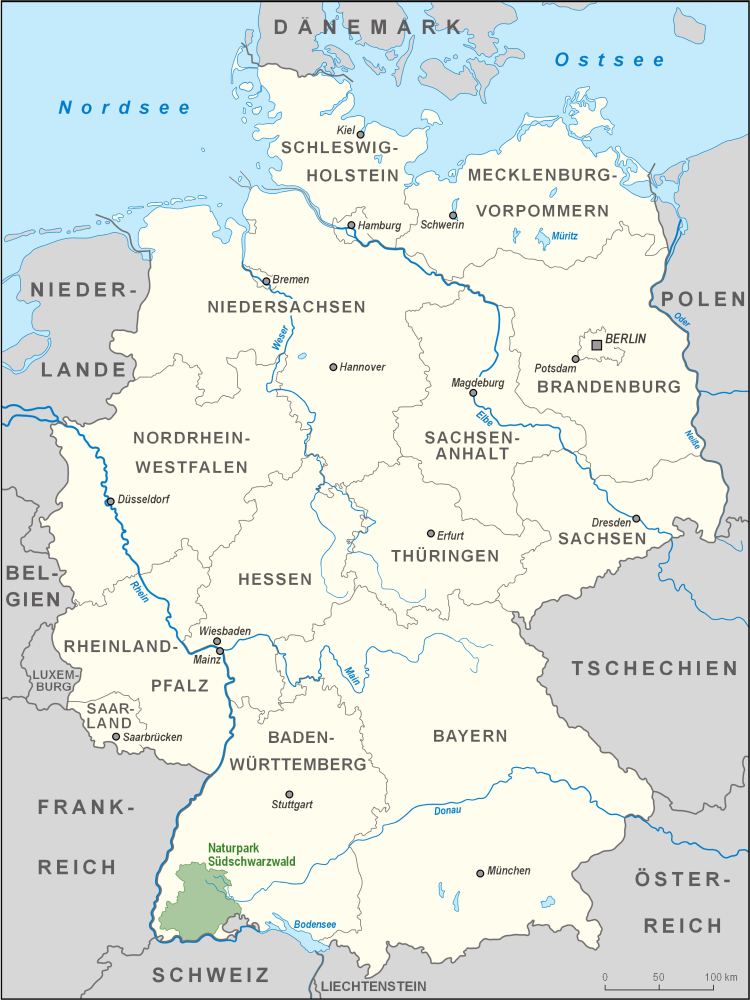
- The area in Green shows the location of the Southern Black Forest Nature Park in Germany.
- Location: Baden-Württemberg (Germany)
- Established: 1999

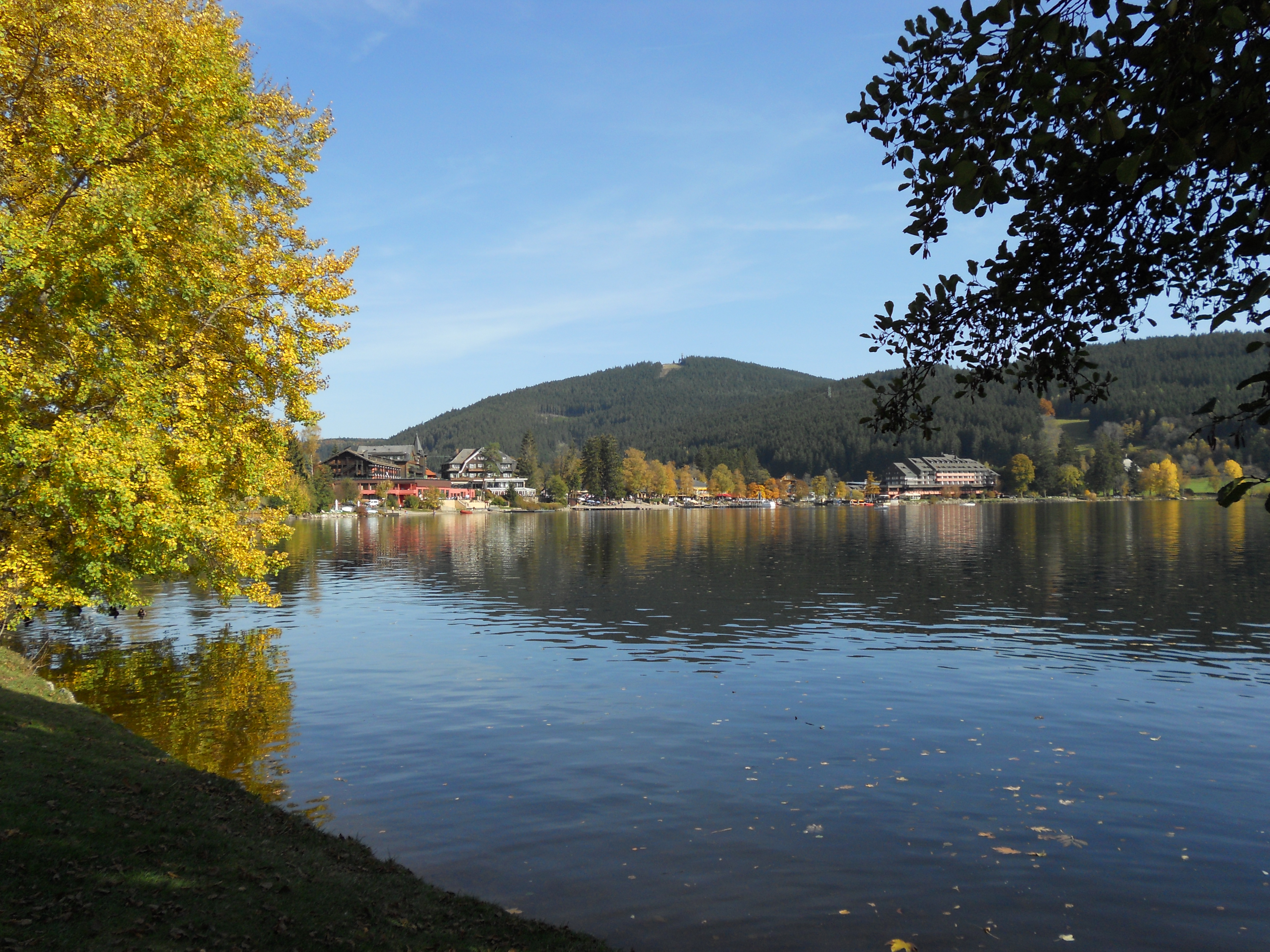
Lake Titisee in the park

The Southern Black Forest Nature Park (German: Naturpark Südschwarzwald) is located in Baden-Württemberg in Germany and covers an area of 394,000 hectares (970,000 acres). As of 2018, it is Germany's largest nature park.

== History ==
The Southern Black Forest Nature Park was established on February 1, 1999. The original area of 333,000 hectares was expanded to 370,000 hectares in 2005, and finally to its present size of 394,000 hectares in 2014. It is one of seven nature parks in Baden-Württemberg.

== Location ==
It is located in the Southern Black Forest in the south-west of Baden-Württemberg, extending from Herbolzheim and Triberg in the north to Waldshut-Tiengen and Lörrach in the south and from the Black Forest foothills near Freiburg and Emmendingen in the west to Donaueschingen and Bad Dürrheim on the high plateau of the Baar in the east.

== Mountains ==
Three of the highest mountains of the Black Forest are located within the Southern Black Forest Nature Park:

- Feldberg (1493 m)
- Herzogenhorn (1415 fm)
- Belchen (1414 m)

Other mountains within the park are, e.g.:

- Schauinsland (1248 m)
- Kandel (1241 m)

== Valleys and ravines ==
In the valleys of the Upper and High Rhine species from the Mediterranean region further south can be found, while in the narrow ravines of the High Black Forest there may still be relics from the last ice age.

Well-known valleys and ravines in the Southern Black Forest are, e.g.: Wutach ravine (German: Wutachschlucht), Haslach flume (Haslachklamm), Rötenbach flume (Rötenbachklamm), Alb valley (Albtal), Ravenna Gorge (Ravennaschlucht), Simonswald valley (Simonswälder Tal), Münster valley (Münstertal), Schleifenbach ravine (Schleifenbachschlucht), Windberg ravine (Windbergschlucht), Great and Small Wiese valley (Wiesental), High Wehra ravine (Hohwehraschlucht) and Wehra valley (Wehratal) as well as Gauchach ravine (Gauchachschlucht) and Enge ravine (Engeschlucht).

== Landscape ==
=== Bodies of water ===
Right through the Southern Black Forest Nature Park runs the watershed between Rhine and Danube which is the main watershed between North Sea and Black Sea. Whereas the tributaries of the Rhine flow down with rapid force steeply sloped mountainsides, the declivity towards the Danube is by far gentler. Rivers and streams include the Alb, Breg, Dreisam, Elz, and Wiese.

In the Southern Black Forest, there are many waterfalls of different sizes and heights. The Triberg Waterfalls and the Todtnau Waterfalls are two of the highest waterfalls in Germany.

Lake Schluchsee is the largest lake in the Southern Black Forest Nature Park. Other lakes are, e.g., Titisee, Windgfällweiher, Nonnenmattweiher, Schlüchtsee, Feldsee, and Albsee.

Most clouds come from the west where they pass the broad lowlands of the Upper Rhine Plain and then have to rise when they reach the Black Forest mountains. Therefore, it rains frequently in the west and in the High Black Forest. Consequently, this is also the area where many bogs could be found in depressions. However, due to age-long drainage and peat extraction, their number has been reduced.

=== Forests ===
There are no untouched virgin forests in the Black Forest. The largest contiguous areas of pristine forest were settled in the Middle Ages.

Originally, the Black Forest was populated above all by firs and beeches. Under the influence of man, these shade-tolerant species were more and more replaced with pines and spruces. An objective of the nature park is to increase again the number of firs and beeches and to cultivate structurally rich and diversified forests where also different broadleaf trees grow.

The wood of the trees is an important economic factor. Timber is used for house-building and mining. In the past, rafters transported it on the Black Forest rivers and then the Rhine, mainly to shipyards in the Netherlands. Sawyers and carpenters settled along the rivers and streams to use their water power. Wood was used for farmhouses, barns, wood shingles, brushes, carnival masks, Black Forest clocks. Wood charcoal was needed for glassblowing.

The forests are not only an important because of the renewable raw material wood, but constitute alson an important environmental compensation factor and have a high recreational value.

Many species of mushrooms grow in the Southern Black Forest, among them edible species such as agaricus, boletus edulis, chanterelle, or truffle. Several species of mushrooms form mycorrhizal associations with trees and bushes.

=== Fields and meadows ===
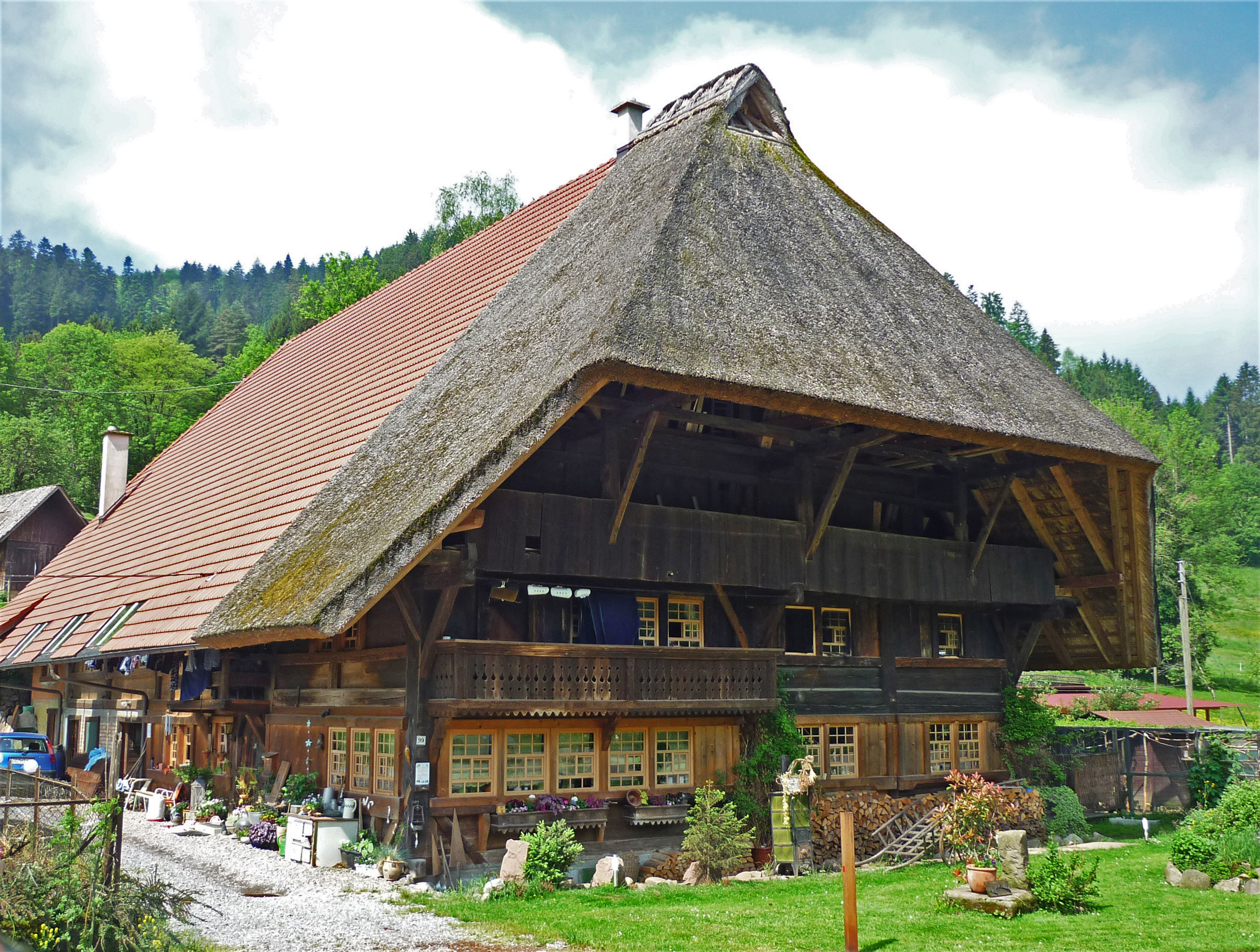
Example of a Black Forest house

The Southern Black Forest is a rural area where the countryside has been shaped by agriculture and animal husbandry. Pasture beeches, a particular form of the copper beech tree, can still be found on the old pastures of the Southern Black Forest.

== Architecture ==
The Black Forest house is typical for the farms in the rural areas. It is adapted to the peculiarities of the Southern Black Forest: built on a slope, isolated location, large amounts of snow and strong winds.

== See also ==
- Central/North Black Forest Nature Park
- Bannwald

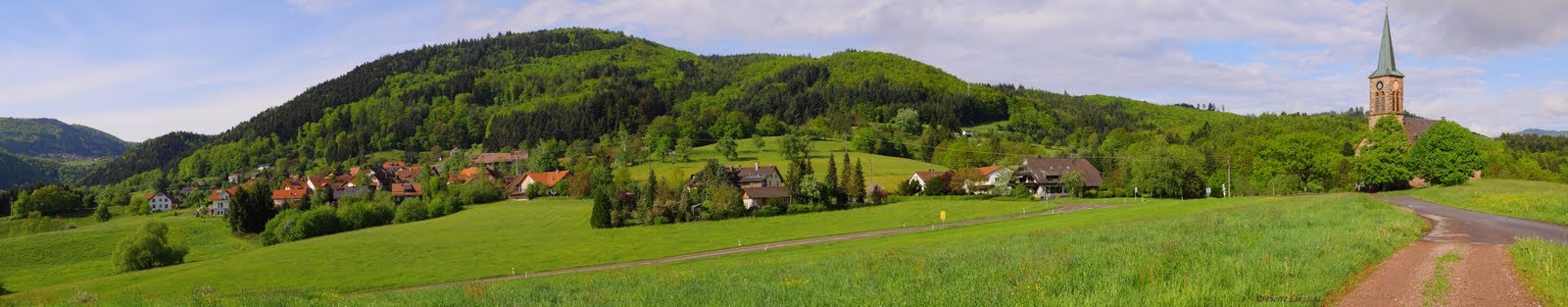
Panoramic view of the Southern Black Forest Nature Park
