= Hainisch =

Hainisch is a surname. Notable people with the surname include:

- Leopold Hainisch (1891–1979), Austrian actor and film director
- Marianne Hainisch (1839–1936), founder and leader of the Austrian women's movement
- Michael Hainisch (1858–1940), Austrian politician

== See also ==
- Heinisch
