= Christlieger =

Island in Bavaria, Germany's Königssee

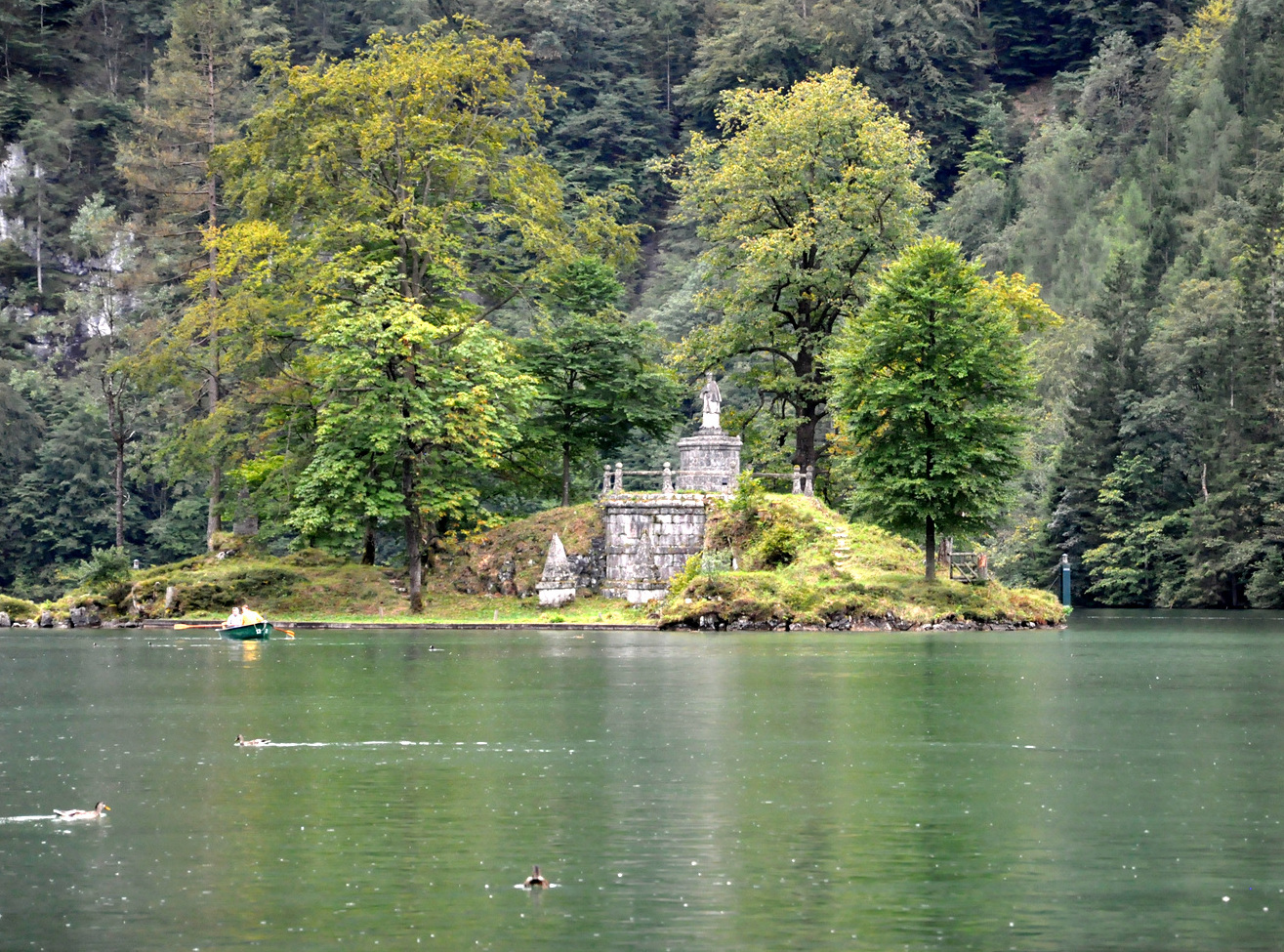
Island of Christlieger, from northwest

Christlieger is the name of the only island in the Königssee lake in Bavaria, Germany. It is located near the northern end of the lake, at 47°35′08″N 12°59′17″E. It is also called Johannesinsel (John's Island or St. John's), after the marble statue of John of Nepomuk that was erected on the island in 1711.

The island is 61 meters long north-south and up to 26 meters wide, with an area of 1260 square meters (0.31 acres). On the eastern side, small boats can land, but not the passenger boats going to St. Bartholomä.

The island is part of the municipality of Schönau am Königssee. The land is owned by the Free State of Bavaria.

== Statue ==
A well-known monument on the island is the statue of John of Nepomuk, patron saint protector from floods and drowning. The statue is about 180 cm high and made of marble. It stands on a hill in the northern portion of the island, on top of a pedestal about two meters high. The statue was erected in 1711 and donated by Johann Anton Zeitlmayer, director of chancellery and land judge of the Berchtesgaden Provostry, after all four passengers involved in a boat accident had been rescued. Since the erection of this statue, the island has also been called Johannesinsel (John's island or St. John's). It is believed that previously a statue of Apostle Bartholomew was at this location.

== Platform ==
The platform on which the pedestal of the statue rests is enclosed by balustrades, and stairs lead to it from north and south. On the eastern side, the platform is supported by a brick wall that has two marble boards attached to it, with the inscriptions referring to the erection of the statue in 1711 and to its renovation in 1811. In front of the wall are two small stone pyramids. Their history and meaning is unknown. Next to this part of the island is the boat landing place. At the southern end of the island, a third stone pyramid was built in the course of the renovation starting in 1810.

== Grotto ==
Under the platform is a grotto, which is accessible through an iron gate from the west. The grotto has a square floor plan, and the side panels have two niches each. At the rear wall is a fountain made of red marble, dated to the late 16th century. It is unknown whether the grotto already existed in 1711, or when the well was constructed.

== Literature ==
- Die „Christlieger“ bekommt ein neues Gesicht. Umfangreiche Quellenforschung und viel Fingerspitzengefühl für die Sanierung der Königssee-Insel erforderlich. Berchtesgadener Anzeiger, Nr. 181, 21 September 1991, Berchtesgaden 1991, Berchtesgadener Anzeiger Verlag.
- Elmar D. Schmid: St. Bartholomä am Königssee. Amtlicher Führer, 6. Auflage, München 1991, Bayerische Verwaltung der Staatlichen Schlösser, Gärten und Seen.
- Geschichte von Berchtesgaden, Band 2,1: Vom Beginn der Wittelsbachischen Administratium bis zum Übergang an Bayern 1810, Teil 1: Politik - Gesellschaft - Wirtschaft- Recht, Berchtesgaden 1993, Plenk Verlag, ISBN 3-922590-78-0
