= Triberg Waterfalls =

Coordinates: 48°07′34″N 8°13′39″E

Triberger Wasserfälle
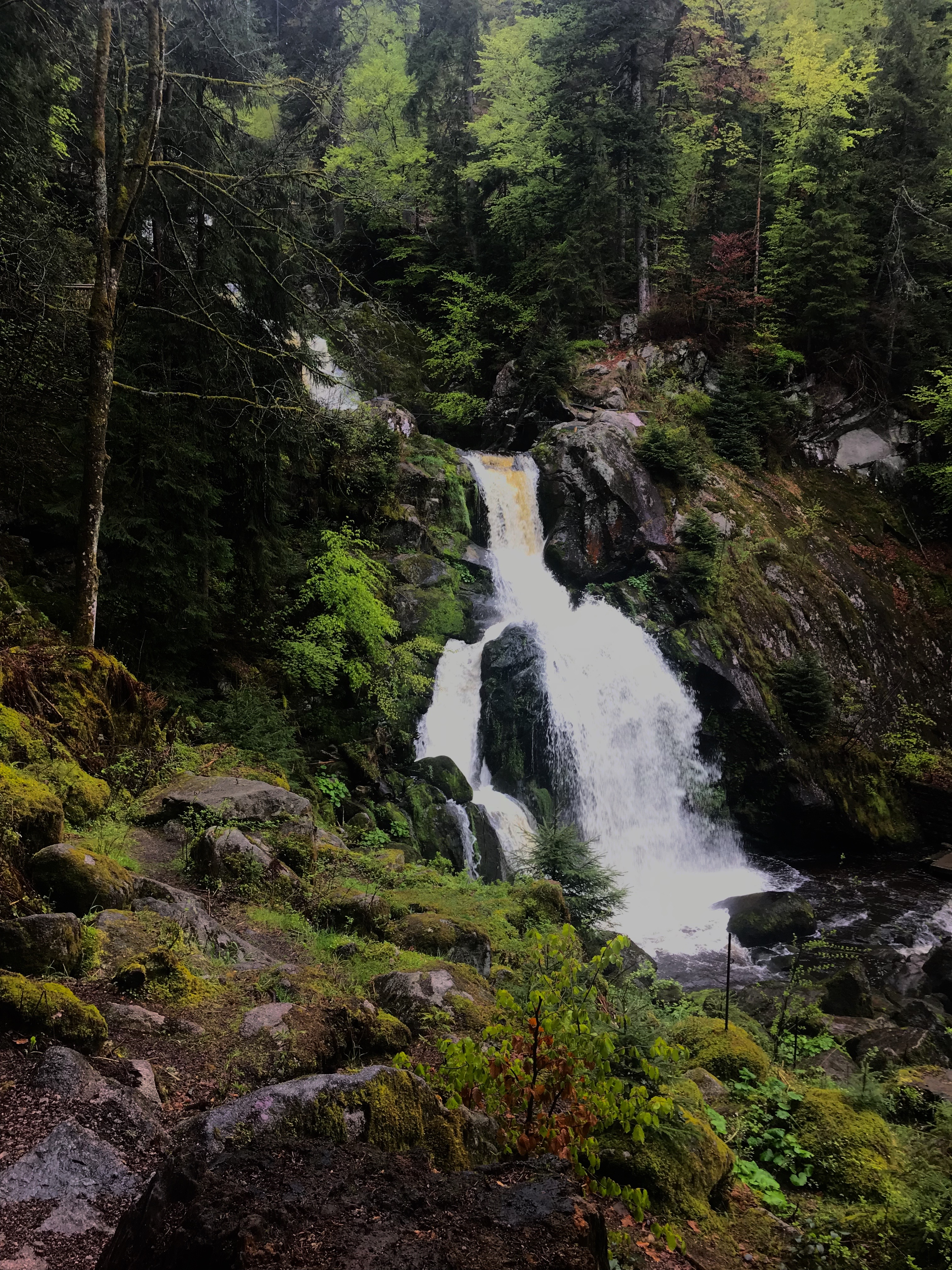
- The Triberg Waterfall
- Location: Black Forest, Germany
- Total height: 163 m (535 ft)
- Number of drops: 7

The Triberg Waterfalls are waterfalls near Triberg in the Black Forest in Baden-Württemberg (Germany). With a descent of 163 m, it is one of the highest waterfalls in Germany and a landmark in the Black Forest region.

Above Triberg, in the midst of Black Forest, the Gutach river plunges over seven major steps from a gently undulated high plain into a rocky V-shaped valley.

In Triberg, at the bottom of the falls, the deep valley forms a basin just wide enough for a small town. The steep basin and the waterfalls were initially formed by two faults in the granite and then by glaciers during several glaciations of the Pleistocene.

Triberg with its waterfalls is a popular tourist spot, attracting a large number of both domestic and foreign tourists each year. The upper part of the falls is less spectacular. Here the water is used by a small and very old hydroelectric power plant.

== Photo gallery ==
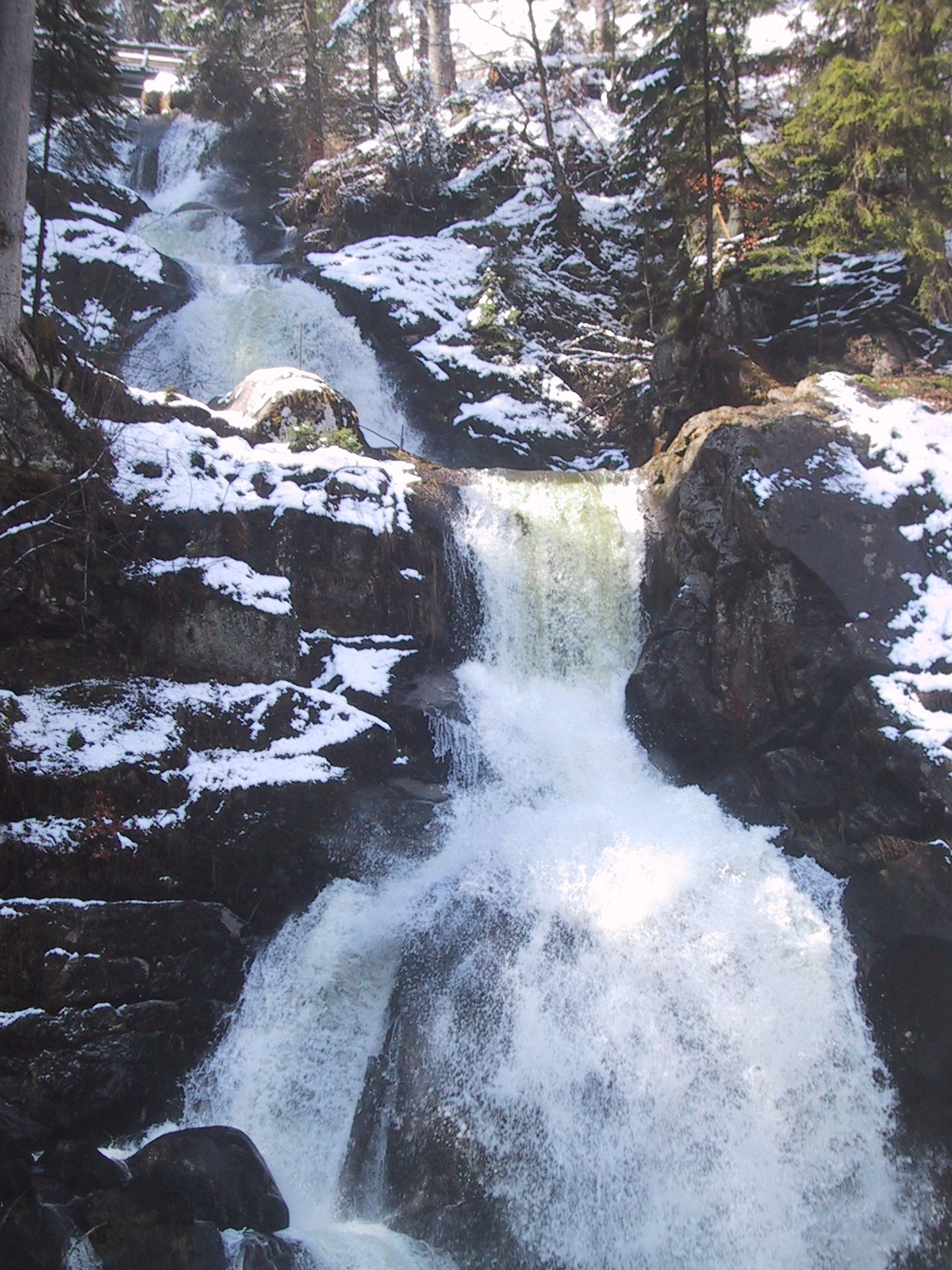
Lowest four steps of Triberg Falls in early spring

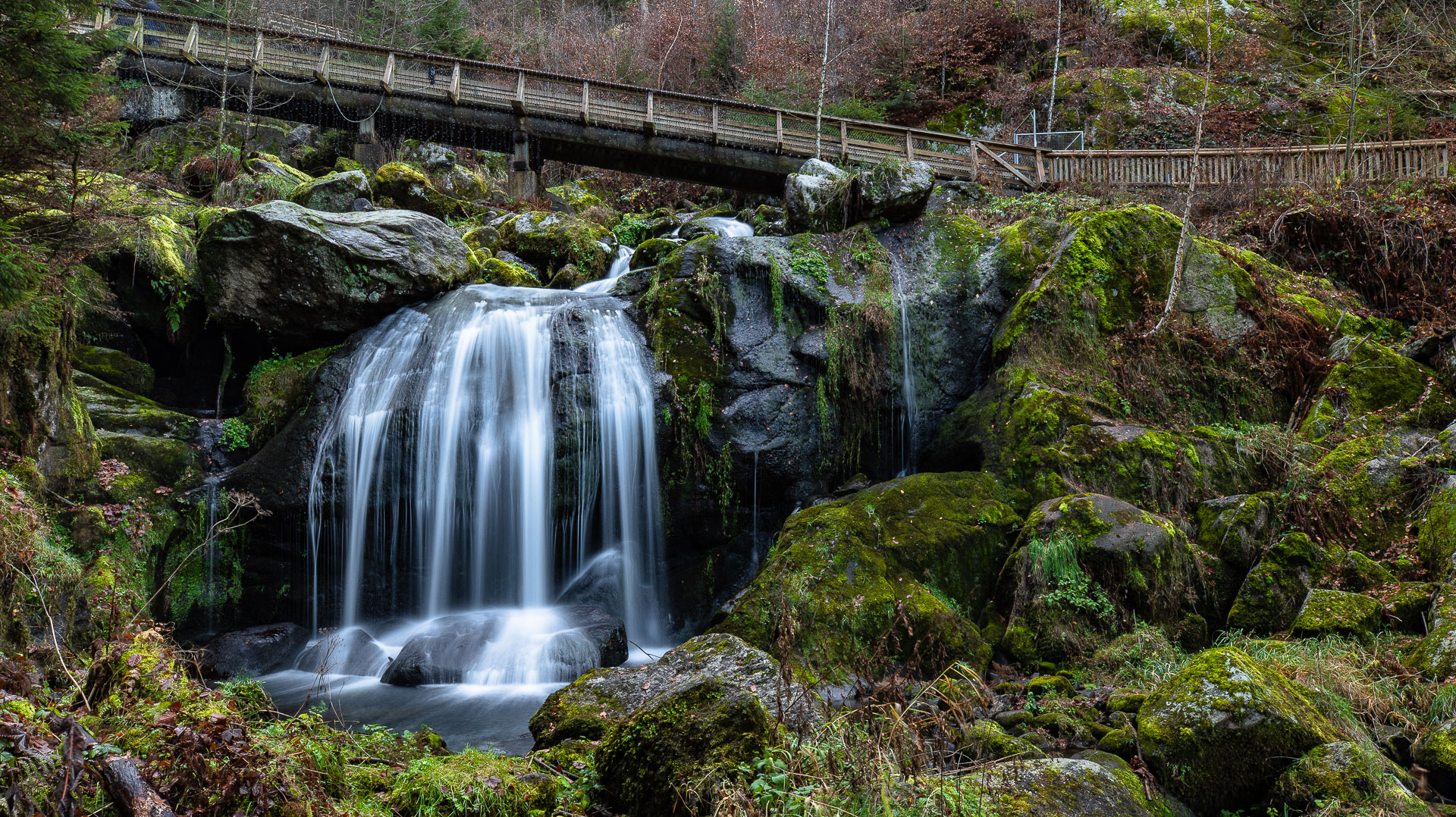
The Triberg waterfalls in 2018

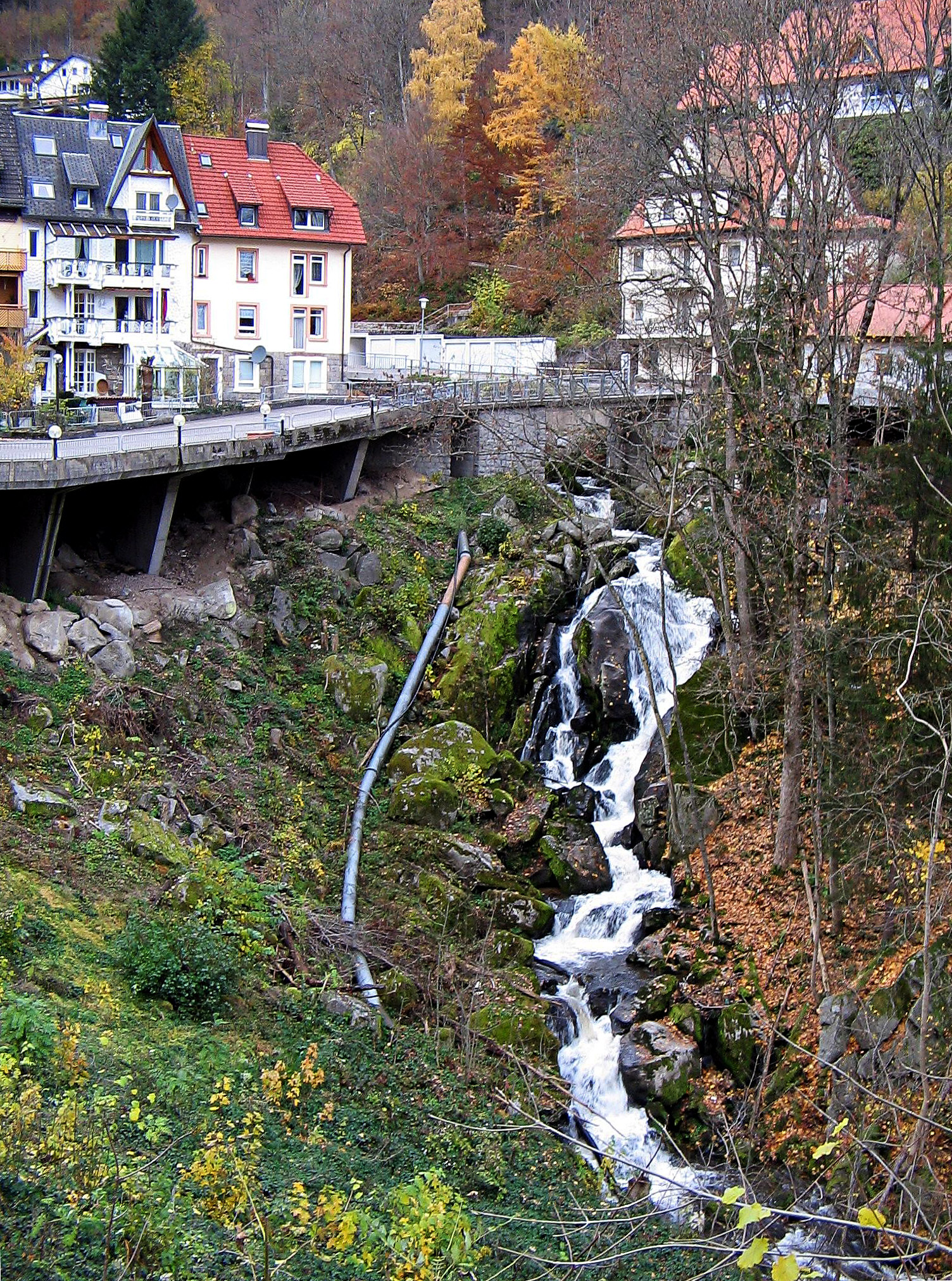
The small waterfall of the Schonach (tributary of the Gutach) in Triberg

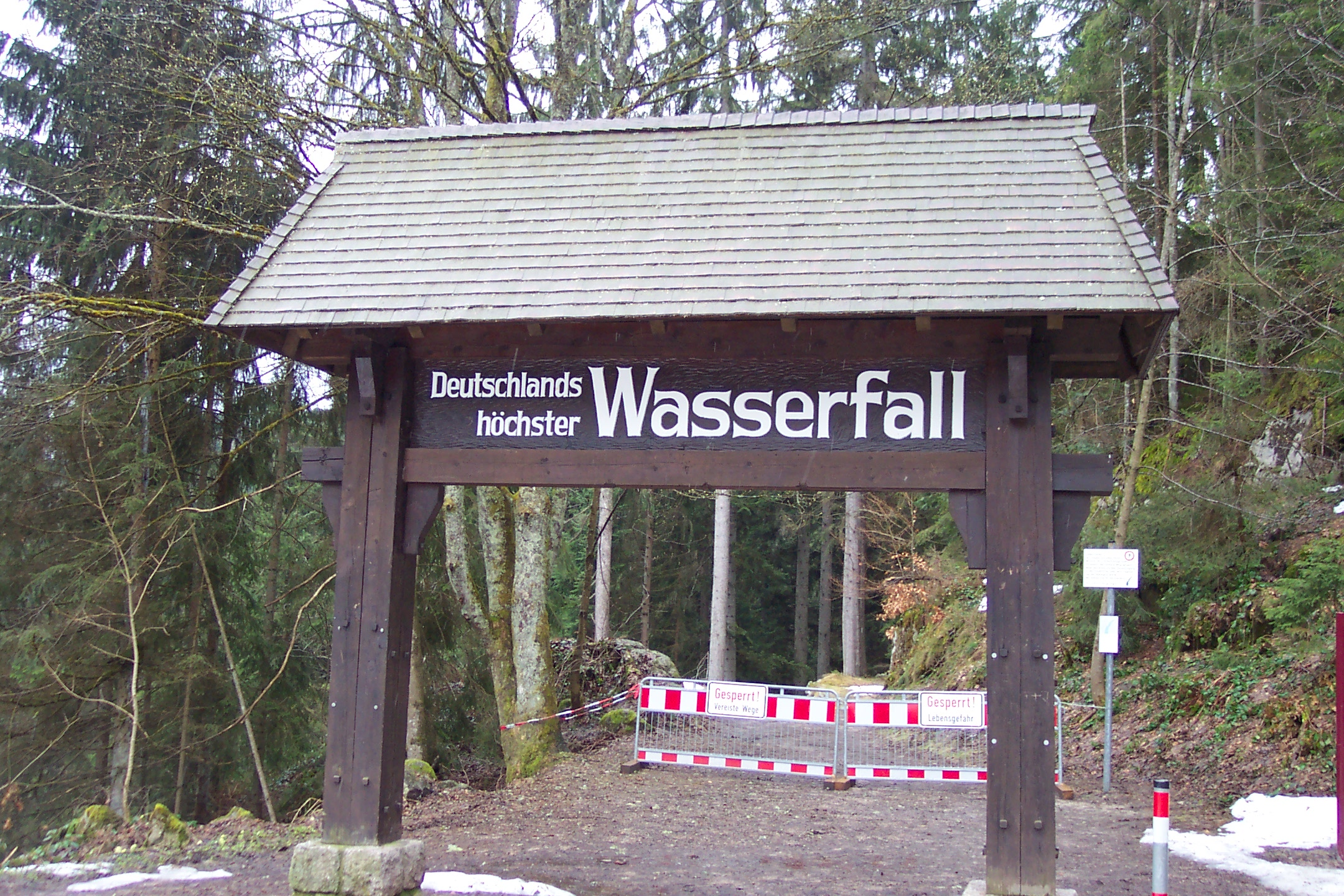
A sign at the entrance of the waterfall: Germany's highest waterfall. (This claim is actually incorrect, as Germany's highest waterfall is the Rothbachfall, near the Konigssee in Upper Bavaria.)

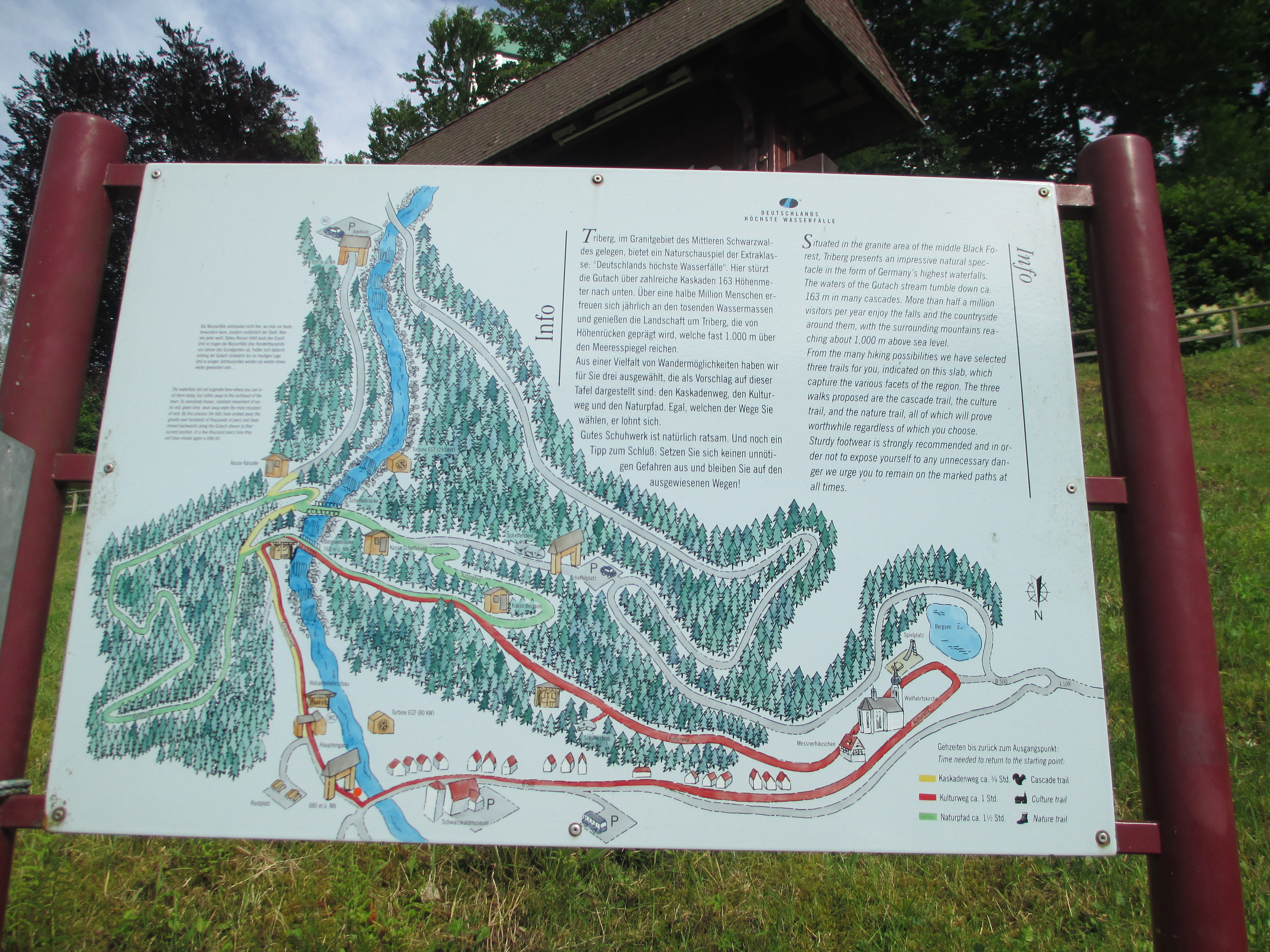
Map of the Triberg Waterfalls

== See also ==
- List of waterfalls
