= Maria in der Tanne =

Church in Triberg im Schwarzwald, Germany

Coordinates: 48°07′54″N 8°13′31″E

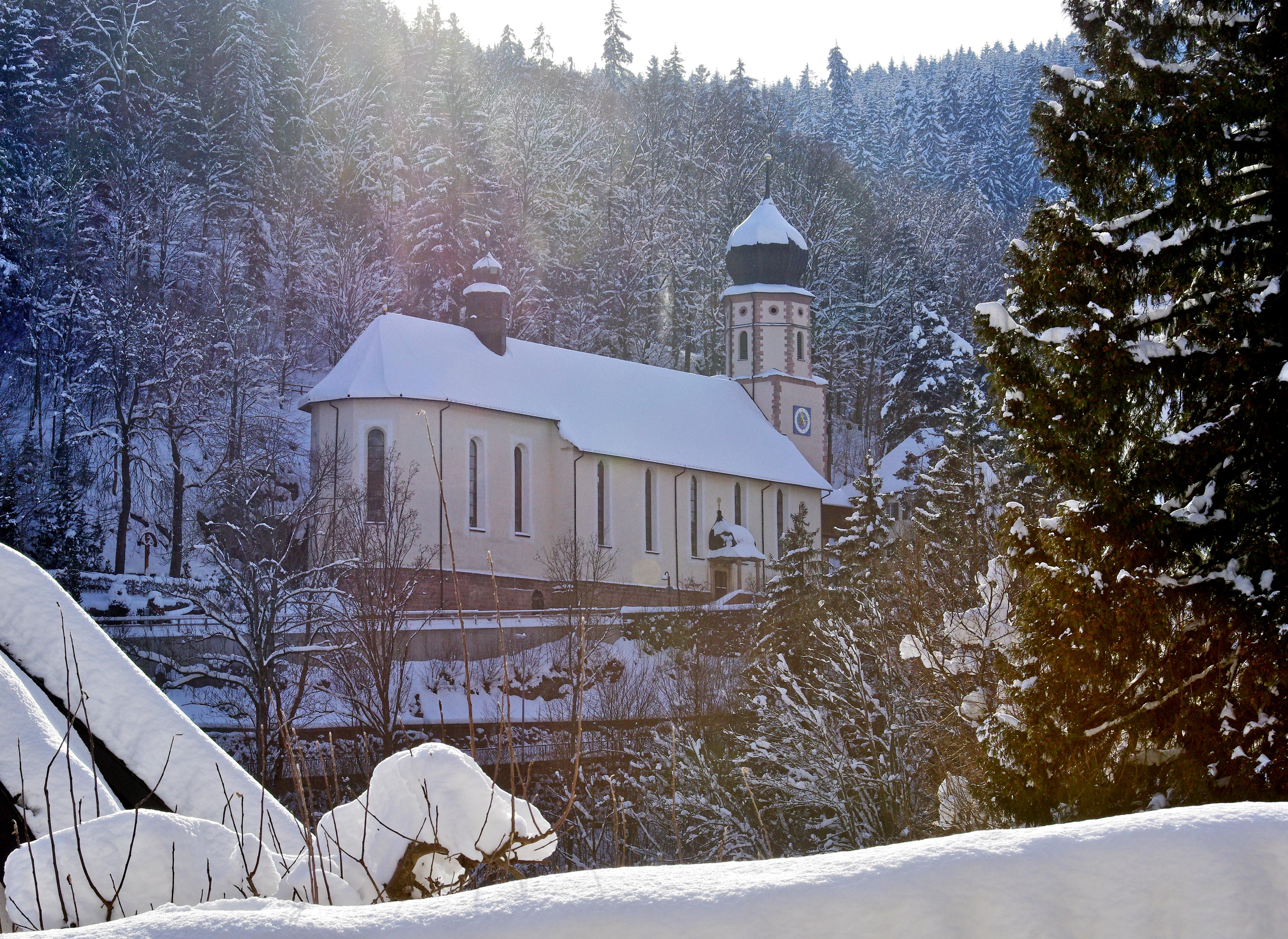
View on the church

Maria in der Tanne is a small baroque church near Triberg im Schwarzwald in the Black Forest of Germany. The legend behind this church dates from 1644, when a young girl was cured from an eye disease by the water of a nearby spring. Within the next year, a local tailor cured his leprosy by washing in the same spring. The thankful tailor placed a small statue of Mary in the cavity of a fir tree (from which the church draws its name -- "Mary in the Fir").

The statue was forgotten, then rediscovered years later by three Tyrolean soldiers around the year 1700. Shortly thereafter, a small wooden chapel, then a larger stone church, and finally the existing church were built by pilgrims.

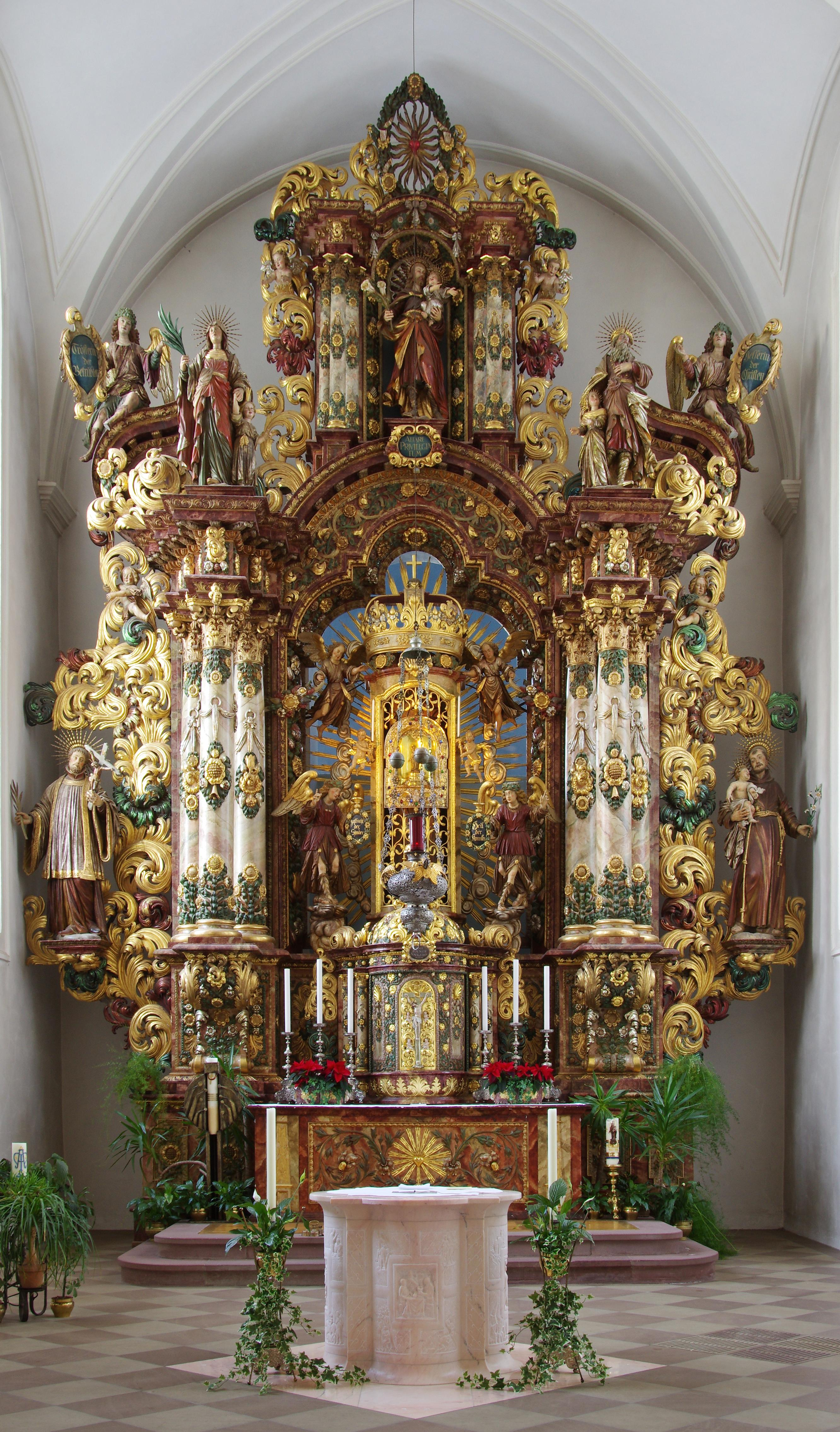
Main baroque altar by J.A. Schupp in 1705.
