= Triberg im Schwarzwald =

- Town
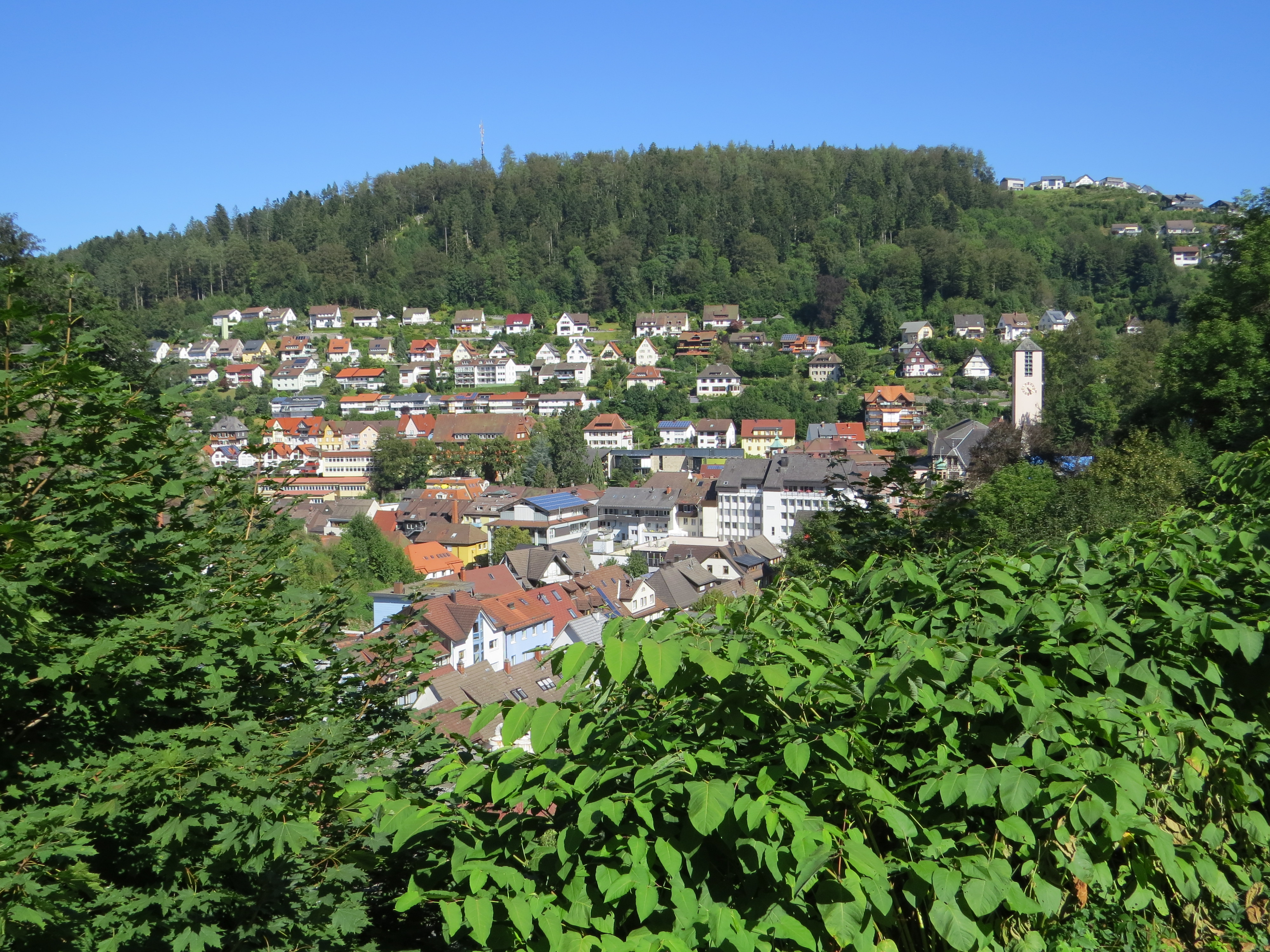
- Triberg seen from the west

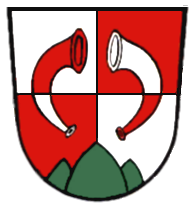
- Coat of arms

- Location of Triberg im Schwarzwald within Schwarzwald-Baar-Kreis district
- Interactive map of Triberg im Schwarzwald
- Location within Germany Location within Baden-Württemberg
- Coordinates: 48°7′51″N 8°13′54″E
- Country: Germany
- State: Baden-Württemberg
- Admin. region: Freiburg
- District: Schwarzwald-Baar-Kreis

Government
  - Mayor (2017–25): Gallus Strobel (CDU)

Area
  - Total: 33.33 km^{2} (12.87 sq mi)
- Elevation: 600–1,050 m (1,970–3,440 ft)

Population (2025-12-31)
  - Total: 4,501
  - Density: 135.0/km^{2} (349.8/sq mi)
- Time zone: UTC+01:00 (CET)
  - Summer (DST): UTC+02:00 (CEST)
- Postal codes: 78098
- Dialling codes: 07722
- Vehicle registration: VS
- Website: www.triberg.de

Triberg im Schwarzwald (German pronunciation: [ˈtʁiːbɛʁk ʔɪm ˈʃvaʁtsvalt], lit. 'Triberg in the Black Forest') is a town in Baden-Württemberg, Germany, located in the Schwarzwald-Baar district in the Black Forest. Triberg lies in the middle of the Black Forest between 500 and 1038 metres above sea level.

Elektrizitäts-Gesellschaft Triberg, a regional utility, was founded 1896 by Friedrich Wilhelm Schoen, Wilhelm Eduard von Schoen and the famous industrialist and inventor Carl von Linde. It is still active today and partially owned by local municipalities. Watchmaking was once a thriving local industry, but no longer plays a central role in the economy. A private hospital, Asklepios Klinik, is the town's major employer.

The number of inhabitants was estimated at around 4.650 in 2022. In 2020, the population was estimated at 4,656.

== Sights ==
- The Triberg Waterfalls, a series of waterfalls in the Gutach River, are among the highest in Germany. With a total vertical drop of 151m (496 feet), the falls are not as high as the highest waterfall in Germany, which is the Röthbachfall. However, the Triberg Falls are better known and have easier public access.
- Black Forest Museum (Schwarzwaldmuseum)
- Maria in der Tanne (Mary in the Firs), a baroque pilgrimage church dating from the 17th Century, once a destination of pilgrimage.
- The handcarved council chamber (which can be seen on the town website)
- World's biggest cuckoo clock
- 40 tunnels of the Black Forest Railway around Triberg.
- A monument dedicated to Robert Gerwig
- Men's parking spaces, a global first introduced in 2012
- Triberg Gallows on the nearby heights of Hochgericht
- A 23 metre high observation tower dedicated to the town's victims of the First World War

The Schwarzwaldbahn Erlebnispfad (Black Forest Railway Experience) is a walking route that takes in some of these sights.

== Namesake ==
The asteroid 619 Triberga is named after this town.

== Notable inhabitants ==
- Efim Bogoljubow (1889–1952), Russian-born German chess player and world championship challenger
- Albrecht Dold (1928–2011), mathematician and professor in Heidelberg
- Christof Duffner (born 1971), former ski jumper
- Hubert Lienhard (born 1951), Chairman of the Board of Management of Voith
- Hans-Peter Pohl (born 1965), Olympic winner in Nordic Combined Calgary 1988

== See also ==
- List of largest cuckoo clocks
- Triberg chess tournament

== Legacy ==
Famous American novelist Ernest Hemingway mentioned Triberg in his short story The Snows of Kilimanjaro. The Hemingway Days were held annually from 1999 to 2002 until they finally were canceled because of a controversy regarding his alleged war crimes.

== Gallery ==
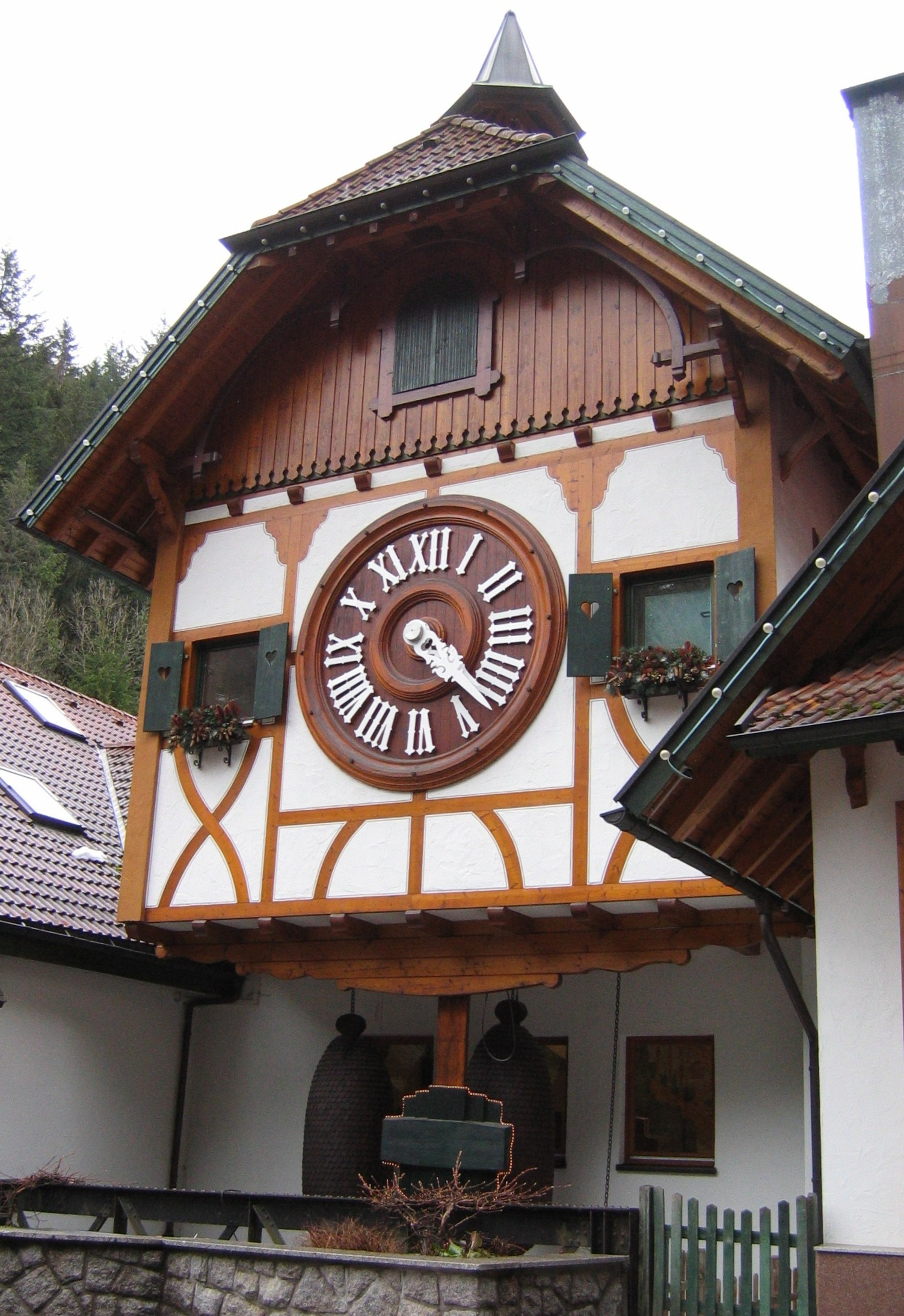
The world's largest cuckoo clock located in Triberg

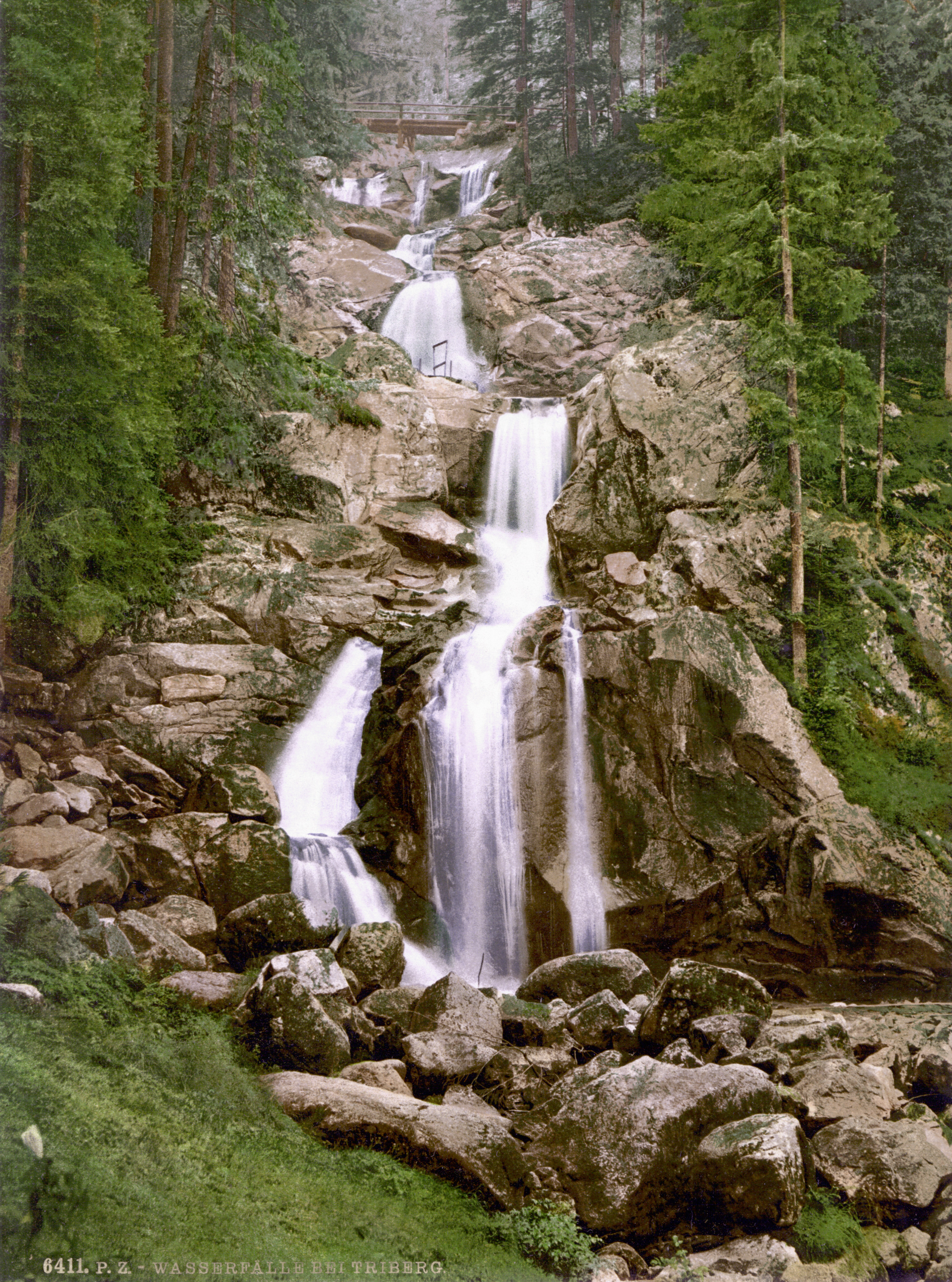
Waterfalls c.1900

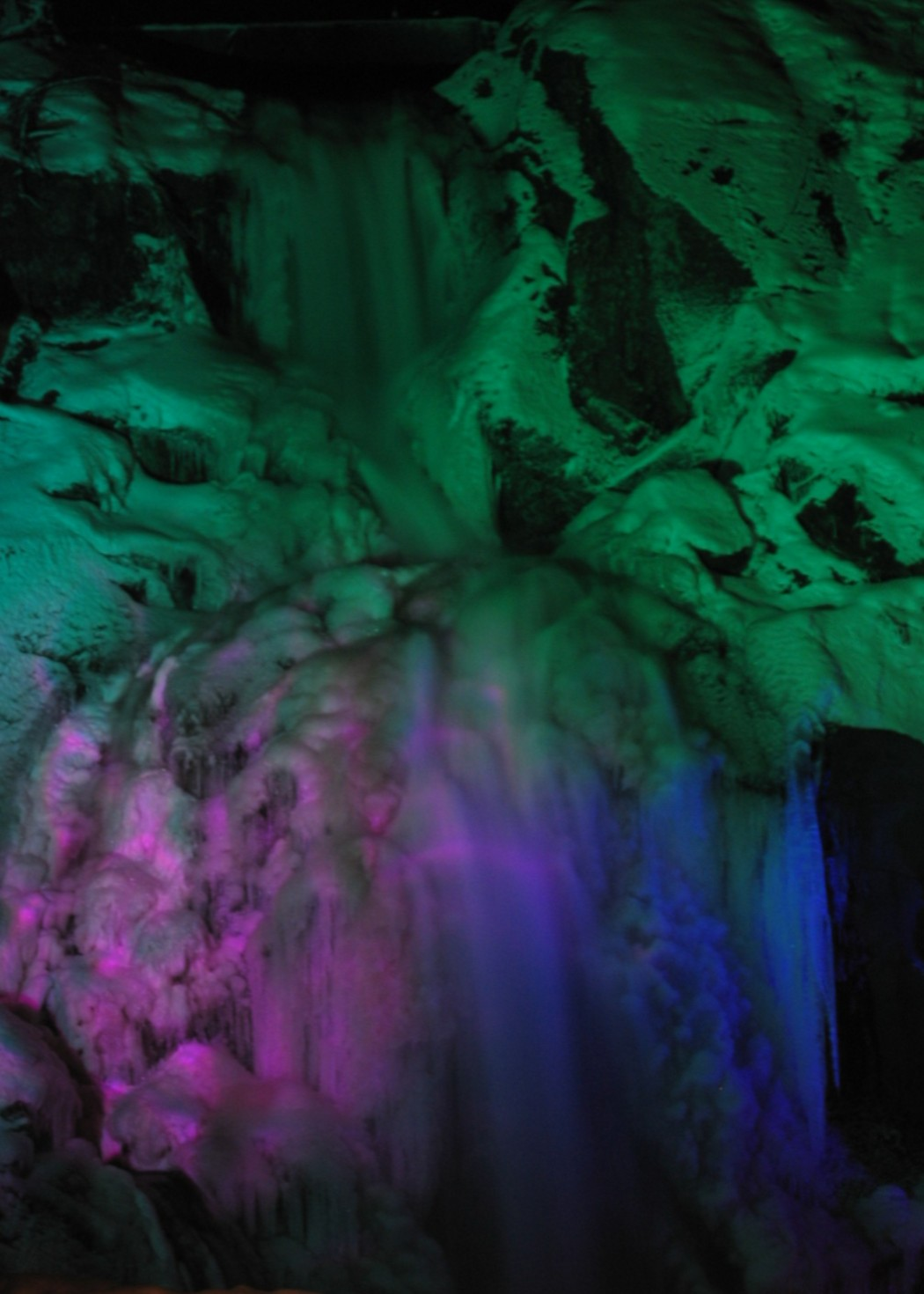
Illuminated waterfalls in winter

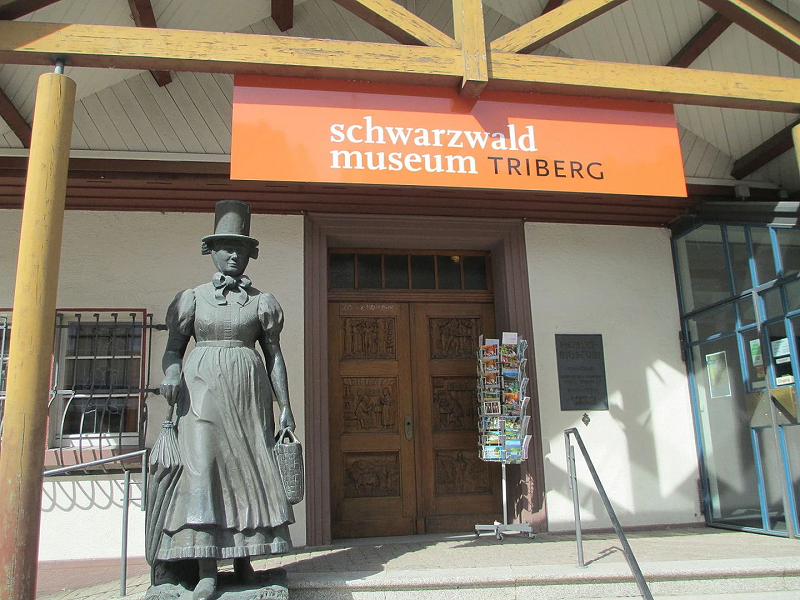
Schwarzwald museum
