= Heinisch =

Heinisch is a German language surname. It stems from a reduced form of the male given name Heinrich and may refer to:

- Fritz Heinisch (1900–1983), American football end
- Gabriele Heinisch-Hosek (1961), Austrian politician
- Ian Heinisch (1988), American mixed martial artist
- Jan Heinisch (born 1976), German politician (CDU)
- Karl Heinisch (1847–1923), German painter
- Martin Heinisch (1985), Czech professional ice hockey forward
