= 619 Triberga =

Main-belt asteroid

Discovery
- Discovered by: August Kopff
- Discovery site: Heidelberg Obs.
- Discovery date: 22 October 1906

Designations
- Named after: Triberg im Schwarzwald
- Alternative designations: 1906 WC
- Minor planet category: Main belt

Orbital characteristics
- Epoch 31 July 2016 (JD 2457600.5)
- Uncertainty parameter 0
- Observation arc: 109.47 yr (39985 d)
- Aphelion: 2.7084 AU (405.17 Gm)
- Perihelion: 2.3342 AU (349.19 Gm)
- Semi-major axis: 2.5213 AU (377.18 Gm)
- Eccentricity: 0.074209
- Orbital period (sidereal): 4.00 yr (1462.3 d)
- Mean anomaly: 188.954°
- Mean motion: 0° 14^{m} 46.284^{s} / day
- Inclination: 13.799°
- Longitude of ascending node: 187.484°
- Argument of perihelion: 178.250°

Physical characteristics
- Mean diameter: 43 km
- Synodic rotation period: 26.311 h; 29.37±0.06 h; 29.412±0.003 h
- Spectral type: S
- Absolute magnitude (H): 9.95

619 Triberga is a main belt asteroid discovered on 22 October 1906 by August Kopff at Heidelberg-Königstuhl State Observatory. Since it has an orbit that repeats itself almost exactly every four years with respect to the position of the Sun and Earth, it has been suggested as a way to calculate the mass of the Moon. Triberga was named for the German town of Triberg.

Since it has an absolute magnitude of 9.9, it is roughly 43 km in diameter. It has an opposition apparent magnitude of 13.5.
