= Röthbachfall =

Waterfall in Germany

Coordinates: 47.503°N 13.012°E

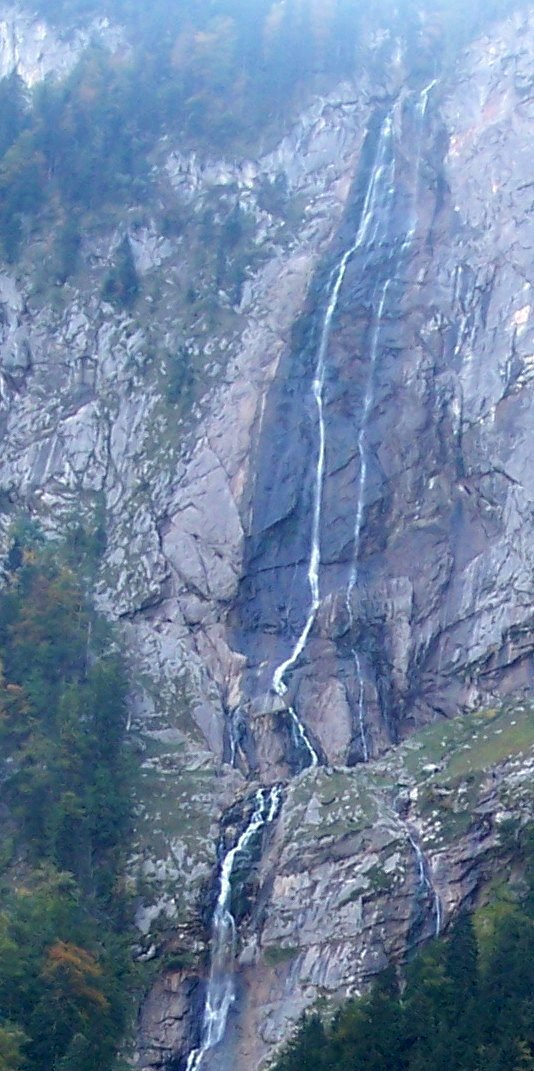
The Röthbach Waterfall in September

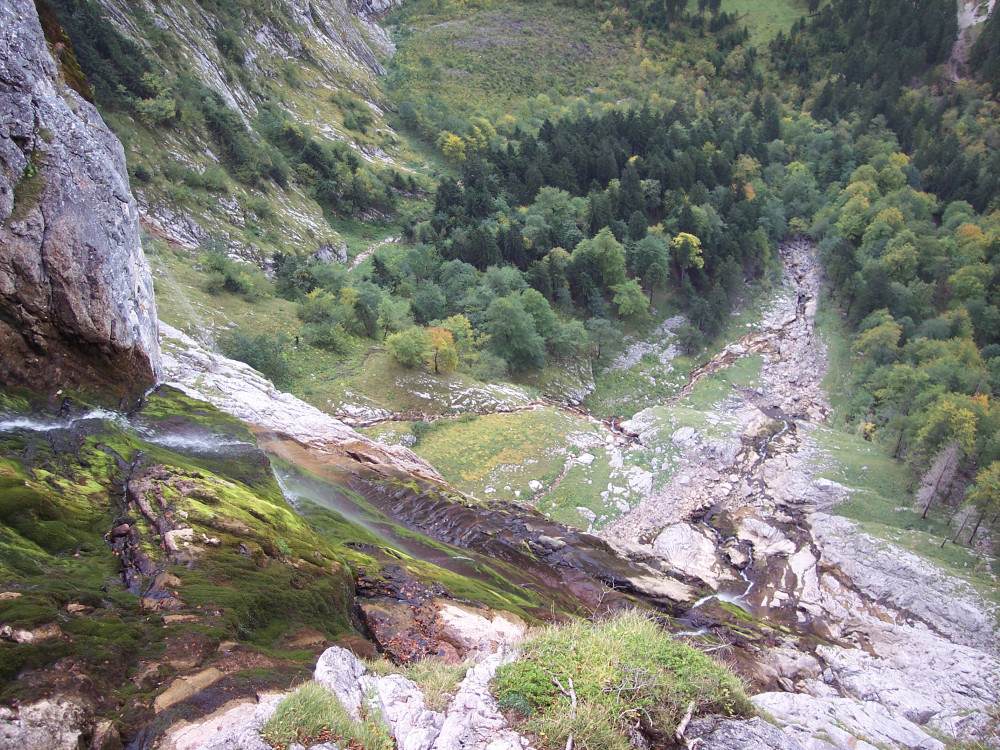
View from the top, at low water in October

The Röthbachfall (German: Röthbachfall) is the highest waterfall in Germany, with a vertical drop of 470 metres (1540 ft). The waterfall is located in the Berchtesgaden area on the Obersee lake. One way to visit the waterfall is to take the electric boat across lake Königssee to Salet and then to hike up to the Obersee. This remote location has led to the erroneous claim that the highest waterfall in Germany is the more accessible Triberg Waterfall even though Triberg has a drop of only 163 metres.

== See also ==
- List of waterfalls
