= Pasture beech =

Species of flowering plant

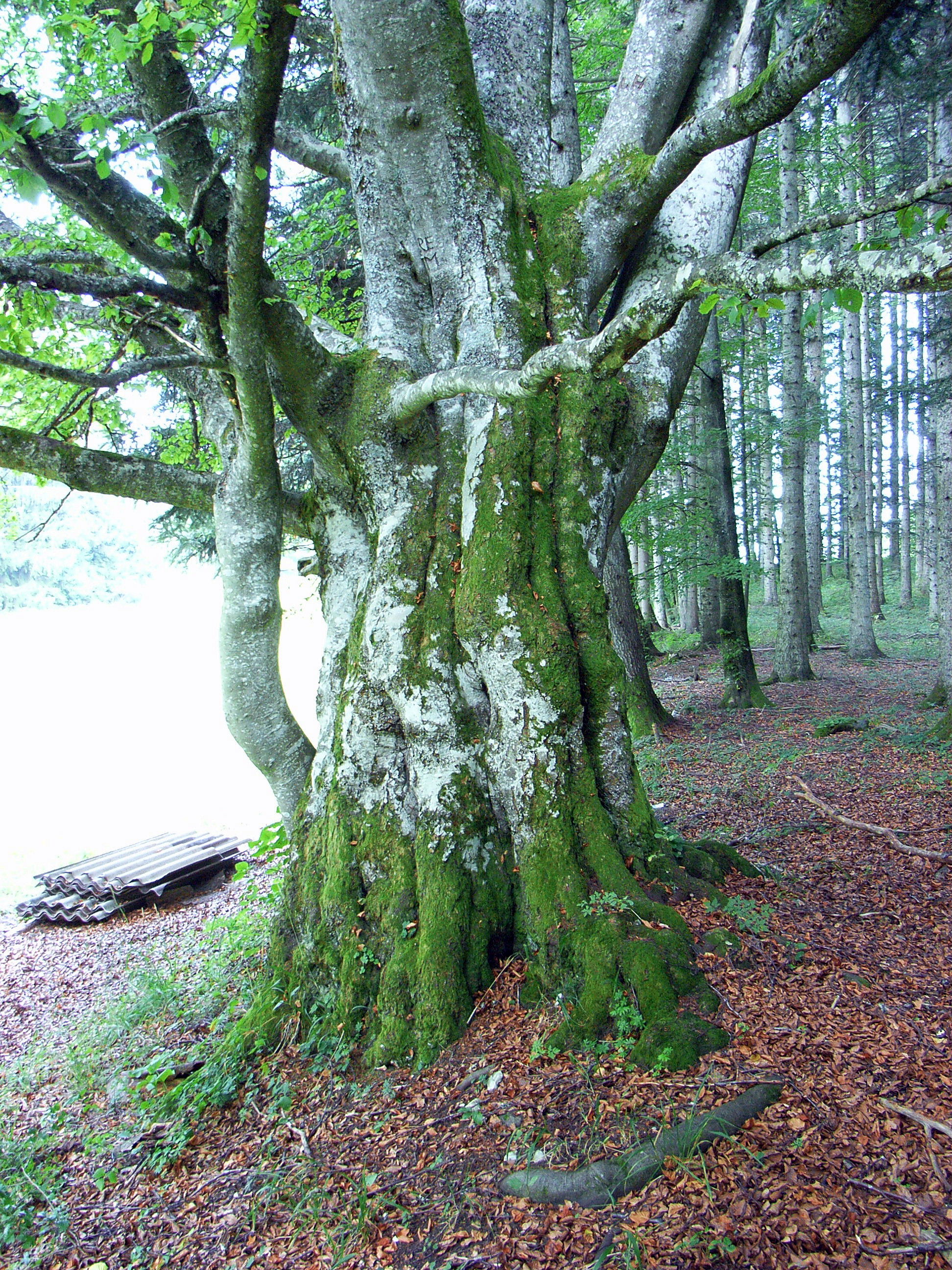
Pasture beech with 13 trunks. On closer inspection, one realizes that what, at first sight, seem to be "branches" are in reality individual trunks.

The Pasture beech (German: Weidbuche) is a particular species or growth habit of the beech which developed in the Black Forest, because the young trees growing on pastures or in pastoral forests were nibbled by the grazing animals, above all cows and goats, i.e. their leaves and branches were eaten and, as a consequence, they have no main trunk and grow bushy.

In the Southern Black Forest 1600 places were found where pasture beeches are growing.
