= Königssee =

Lake in Schönau am Königsee, Bavaria, Germany

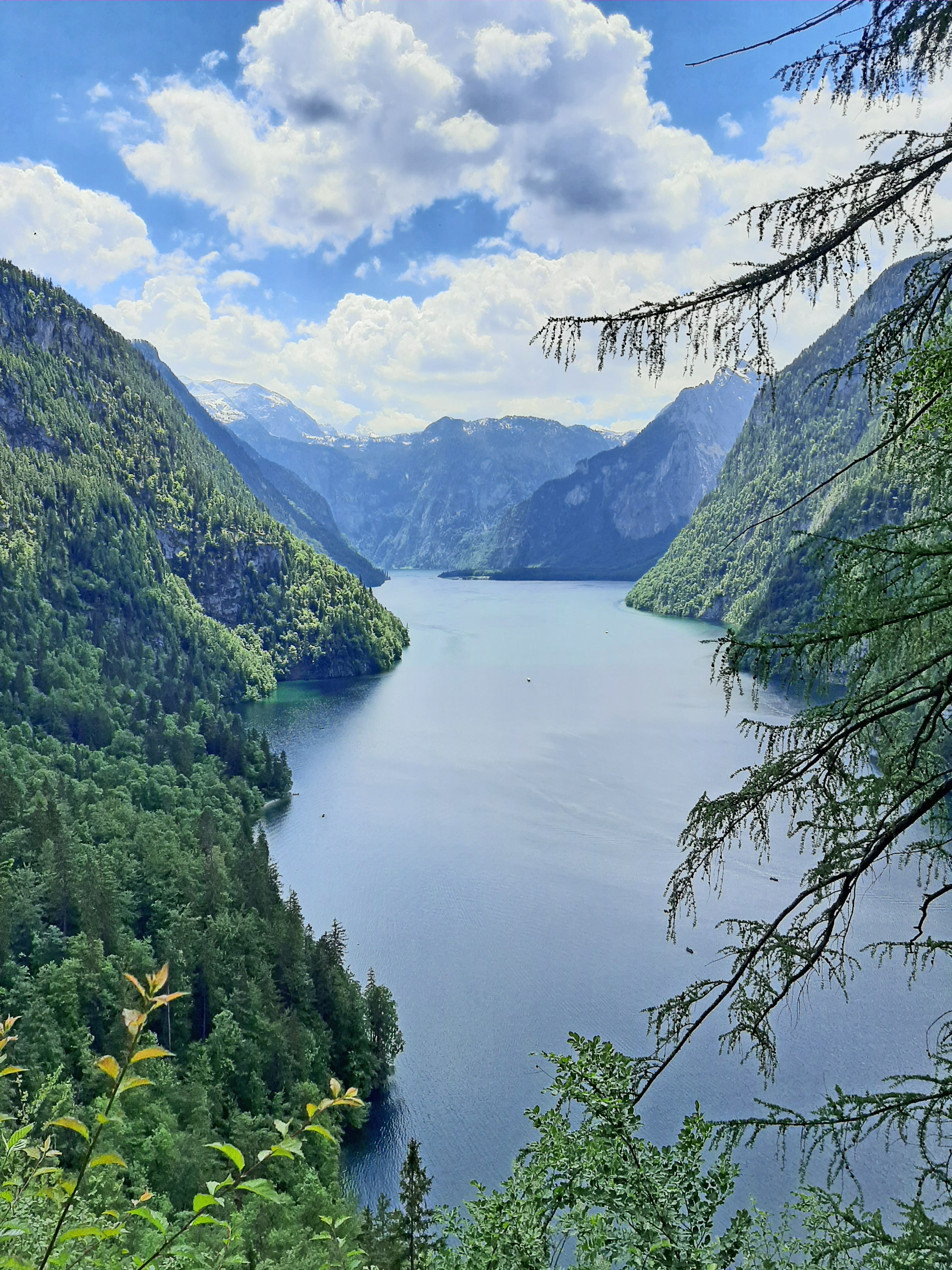
- View from the north

- Location within Germany Location within Bavaria
- Location: Schönau am Königssee, Bavaria, Germany
- Coordinates: 47°33′N 12°58′E
- Type: Natural lake
- Primary inflows: Schreinbach, Saletbach (from the Obersee), Kesselbach, Eisbach, Königsbach
- Primary outflows: Königsseer Ache to Salzach
- Basin countries: Germany
- Max. length: 7.7 km (4.8 mi)
- Max. width: 1.7 km (1.1 mi)
- Surface area: 5.218 km^{2} (2.015 sq mi)
- Average depth: 98.1 m (322 ft)
- Max. depth: 190 m (620 ft)
- Water volume: 511,785,000 m^{3} (414,911 acre⋅ft)
- Surface elevation: 603 m (1,978 ft)
- Islands: Christlieger
- Settlements: Schönau am Königssee Ortsteil Königssee

The Königssee (German pronunciation: [ˈkøːnɪçsˌzeː]) is a natural lake in the southeast Berchtesgadener Land district of the German state of Bavaria, near the Austrian border. Most of the lake is within the Berchtesgaden National Park.

== Description ==
Situated within the Berchtesgaden Alps in the municipality of Schönau am Königsee, just south of Berchtesgaden and the Austrian city of Salzburg, the Königssee is Germany's third deepest lake. Located at a Jurassic rift, it was formed by glaciers during the last ice age. It stretches about 7.7 km (4.8 mi) in a north-south direction and is about 1.7 km (1 mi) across at its widest point. Except at its outlet, the Königsseer Ache at the village of Königssee, the lake is similar to a fjord, being surrounded by the steeply-rising flanks of mountains up to 2,700 m (8,900 ft), including the Watzmann massif in the west.

The literal translation of the name, Königssee, appears to be "king's lake"; however while German: König does indeed mean "king", there had been no Bavarian kings since the days of Louis the German (d. 876) until Elector Maximilian I Joseph assumed the royal title in 1806. Therefore, the name more probably stems from the first name Kuno of local nobles, who appear in several historical sources referring to the donation of the Berchtesgaden Provostry in the twelfth century; the lake was formerly called Kunigsee.

The Königssee Railway (Königsseebahn) served the lake from 1909 until 1965. Its last tracks were dismantled during 1971, and the former station of the Königssee Railway in Berchtesgaden (Königsseer Bahnhof) was demolished in 2012. The only remaining element of the railway is the Königsee station, which is now a restaurant. The track route is mostly used as a walking path.

In 1944, a sub-camp of the Dachau concentration camp was built nearby, located near a residence Heinrich Himmler had built at Schönau for his mistress Hedwig Potthast.

The lake is noted for its clear water and is advertised as the cleanest lake in Germany. For this reason, only electric-powered passenger ships, rowing, and pedal boats have been permitted on the lake since 1909. Passenger services along the length of the lake are operated by the Bayerische Seenschifffahrt company and call at Seelände (Schönau), St. Bartholomä, Salet (mid-April to mid-October), and Kessel (on request). In ideal conditions, the longest tour takes two hours from Seelände to Salet. Swimming is permitted except in the lock area at Seelände.

Due to its picturesque setting, the lake and surrounding parklands are very popular with tourists and hikers. In addition, the surrounding sheer rock walls create an echo known for its clarity. On boat tours, it has become traditional to stop and play a flugelhorn or trumpet to demonstrate the echo. Previously demonstrated by shooting a cannon, the echo can be heard to reverberate up to seven times. The trumpeter plays along with the echo, so that there can seem to be as many as seven players.

St. Bartholomä, a famous pilgrimage church with an inn nearby, is located on a peninsula about halfway down the western lake shore. The small Christlieger island is located near its northern end. South of the Königssee, separated by the Salet moraine, is the smaller Obersee lake with the 470 m (1,540 ft) high Röthbach waterfall. Because there is no lakeside path on the steep shore of the Königssee, St. Bartholomä and the southern edge can only be reached by boat, or via hiking trails up the surrounding mountains, except during harsh winters when the lake freezes over. Stepping on the ice, however, can be fatal, as it was for a motorist who drowned in his Volkswagen Beetle on the way back from St. Bartholomä in January 1964. The car was found only in 1997 at a depth of about 100 m (330 ft).

== Gallery ==
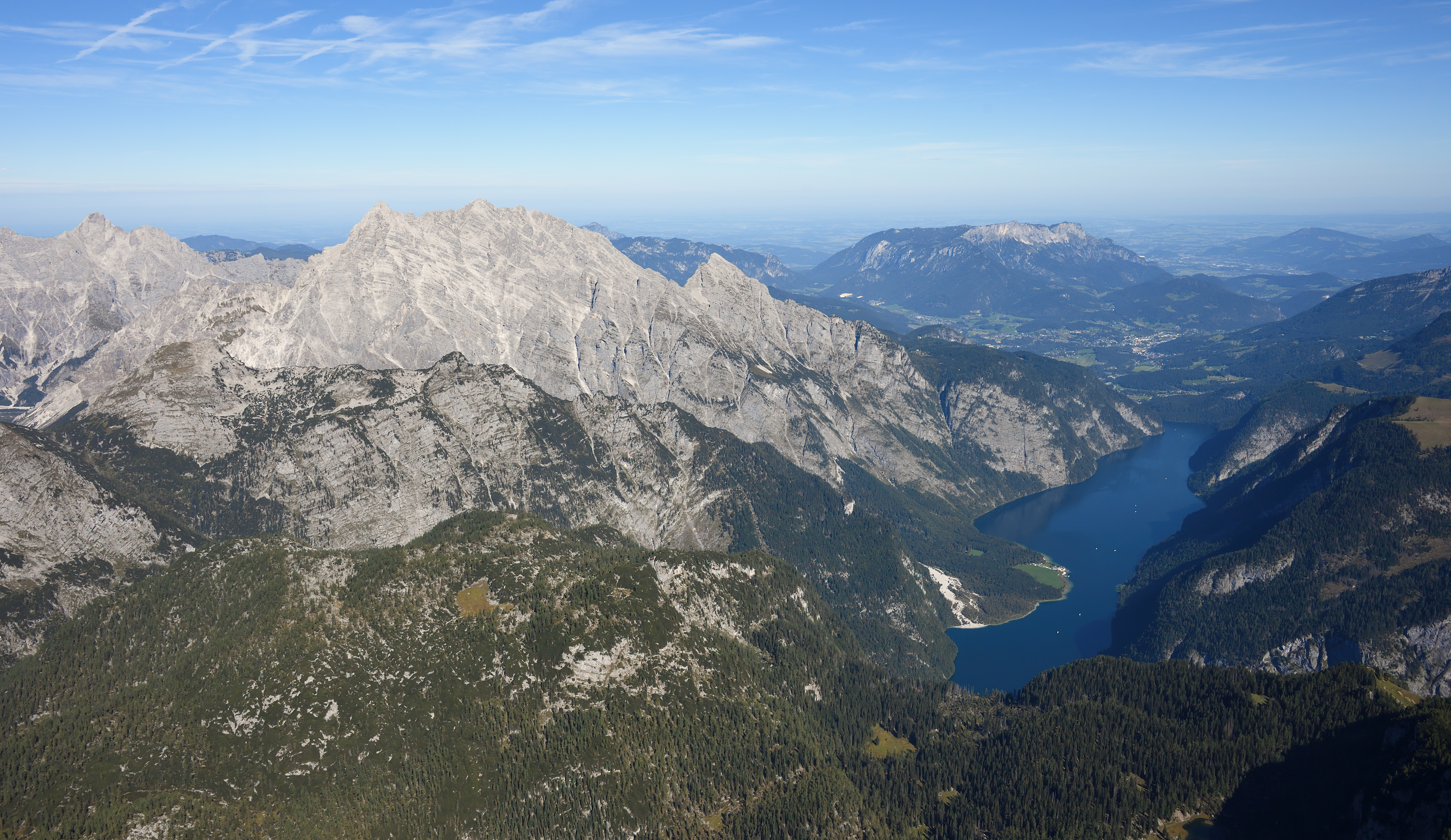
Aerial view of Watzmann and Königssee

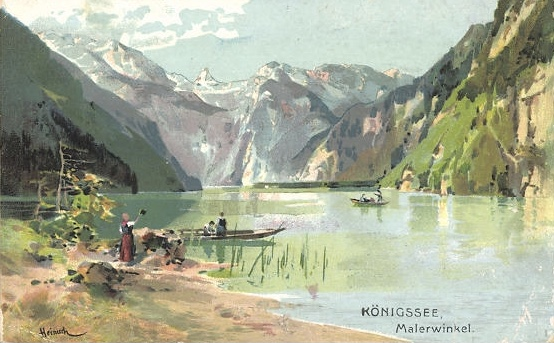
"Königssee Malerwinkel" by Karl Heinisch, c. 1903

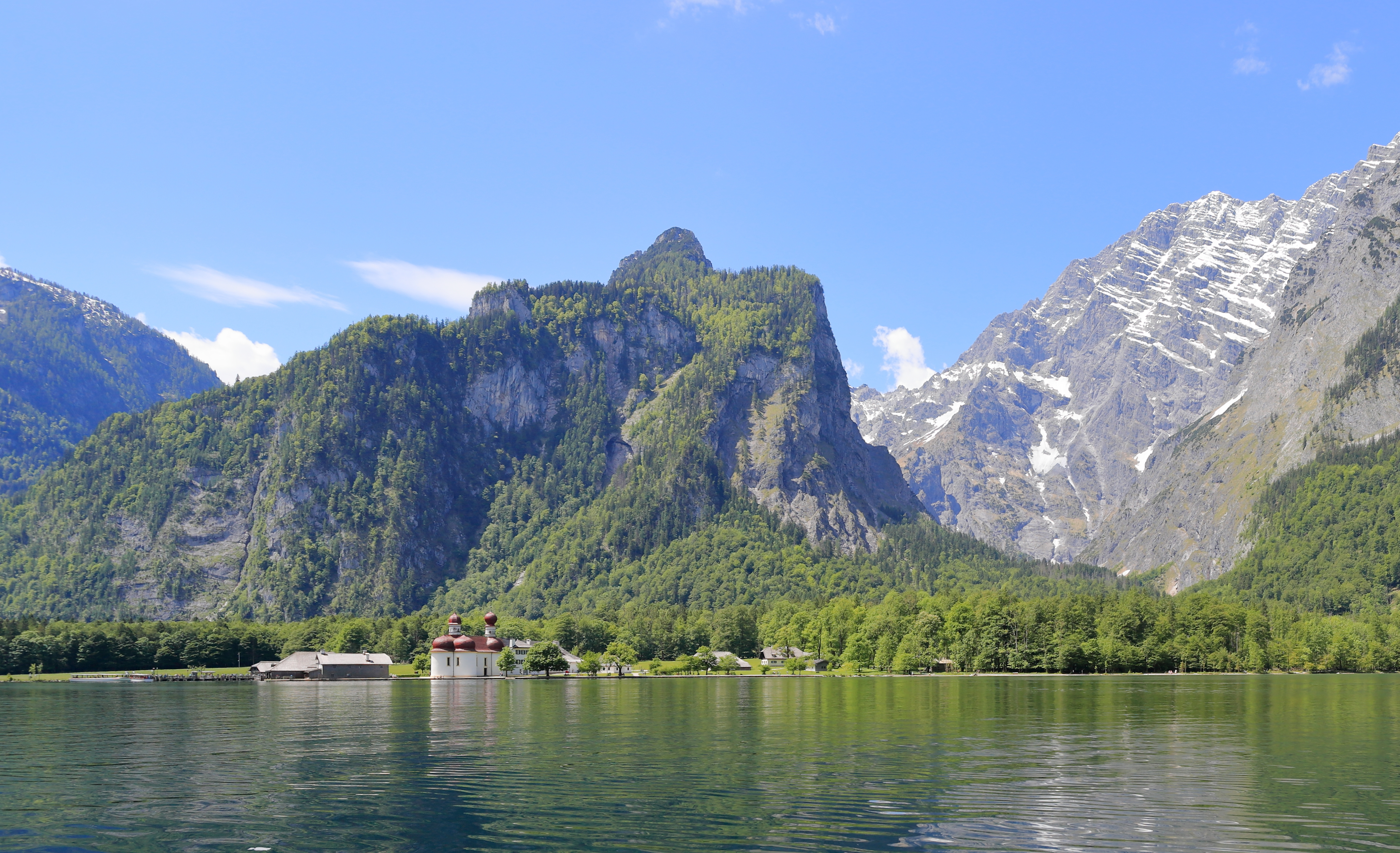
Hirschau peninsula

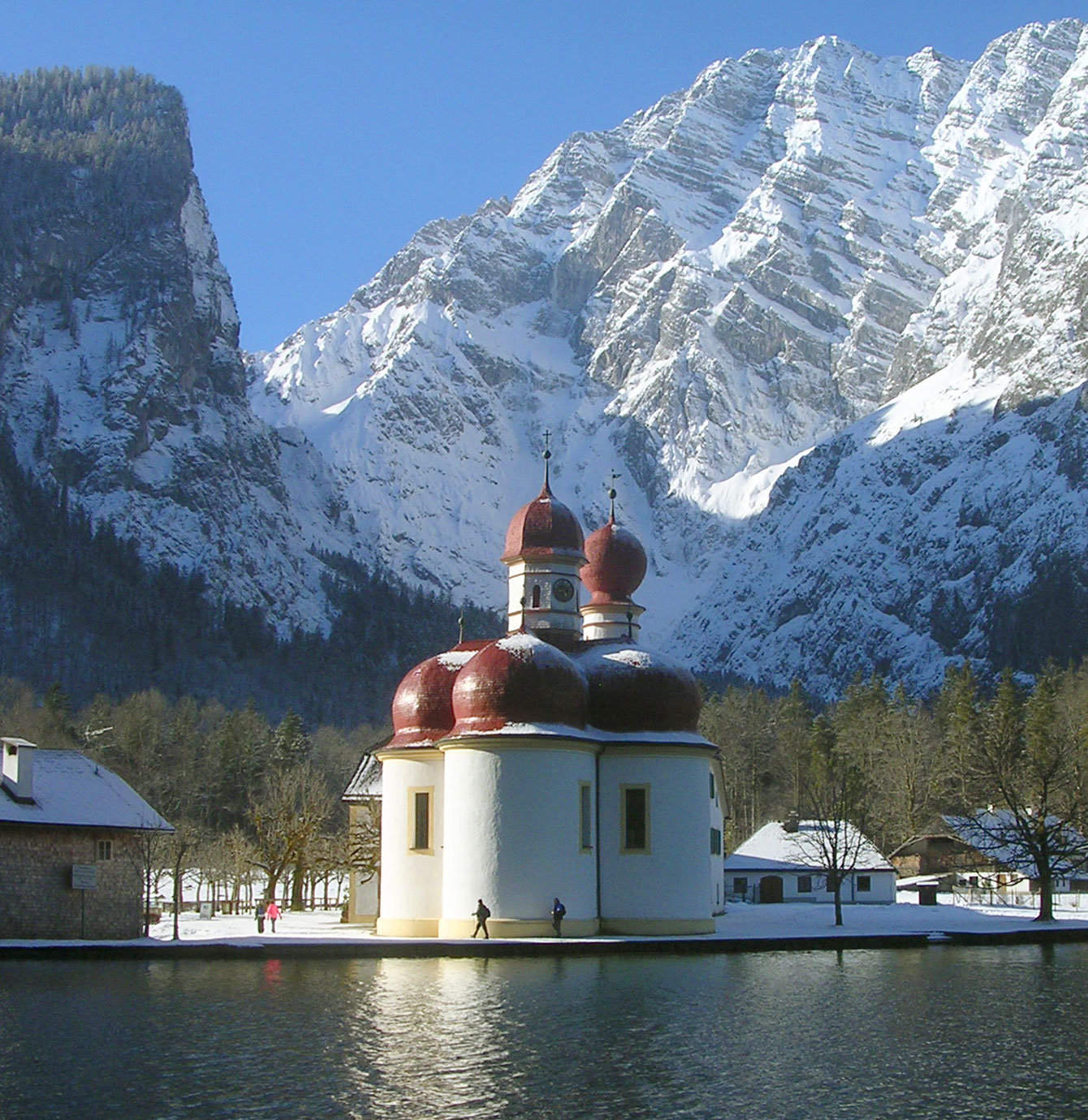
St. Bartholomä and Watzmann

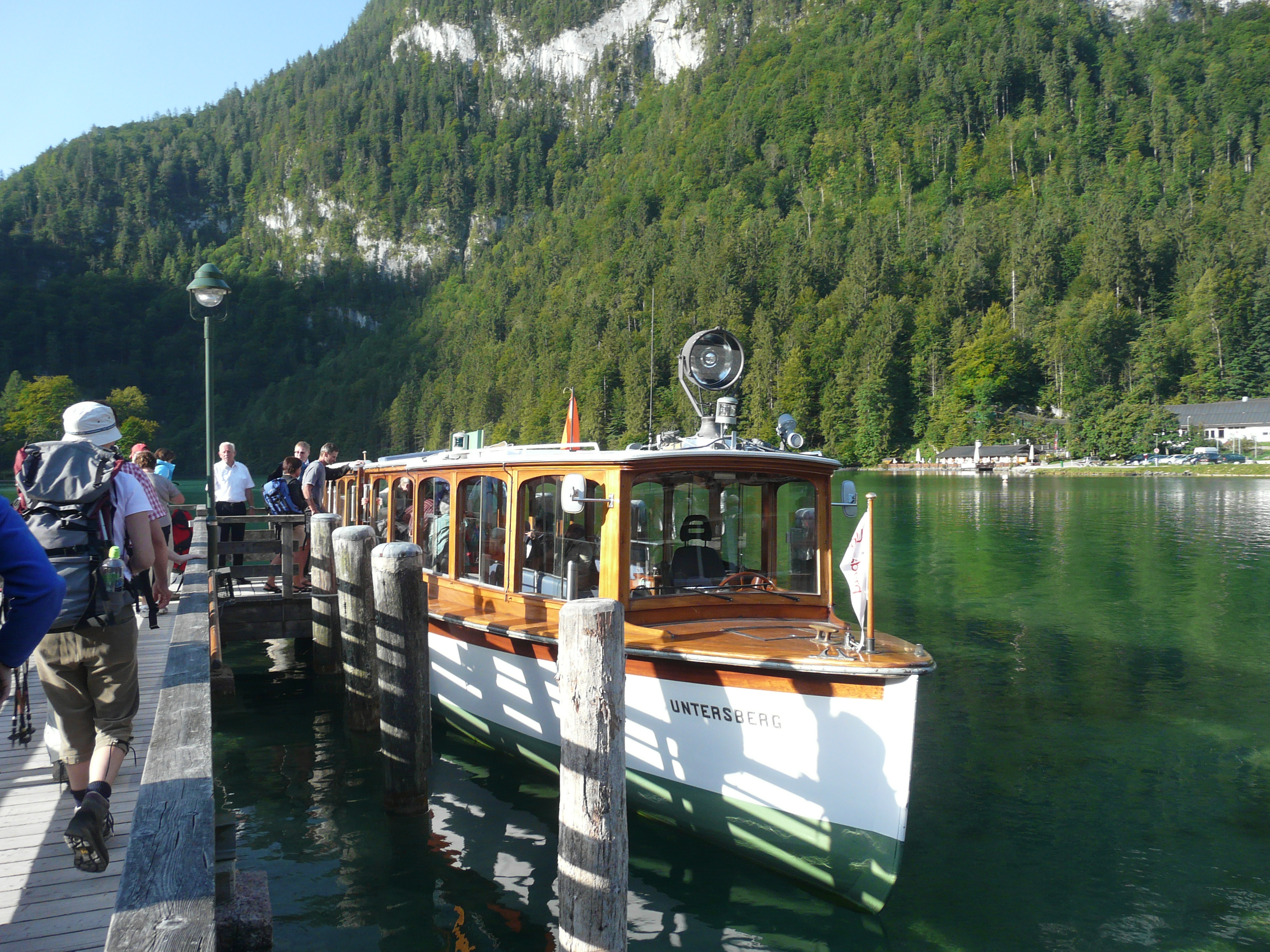
An electric passenger launch at Schönau on the lake

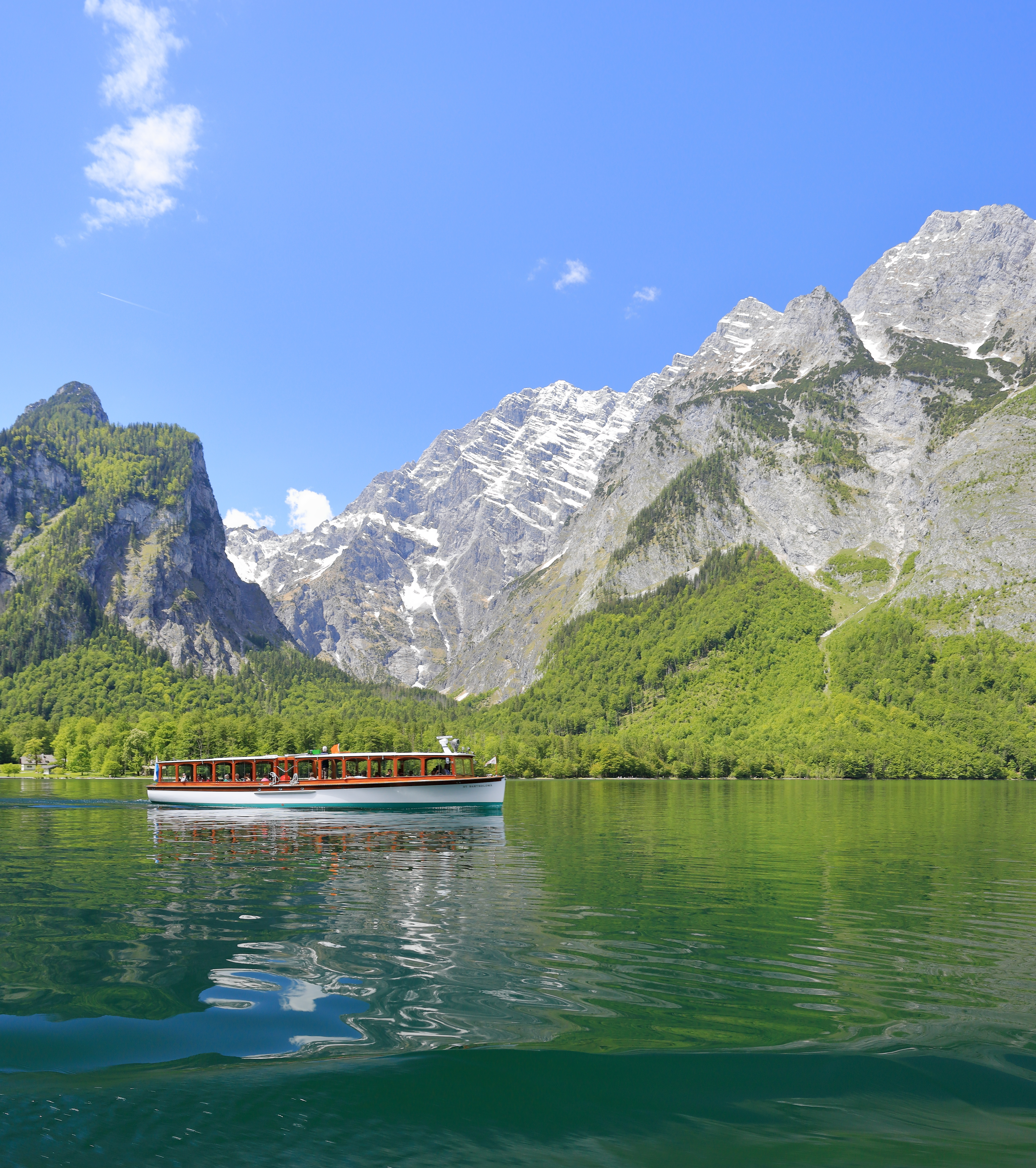
Passenger boat crossing the lake

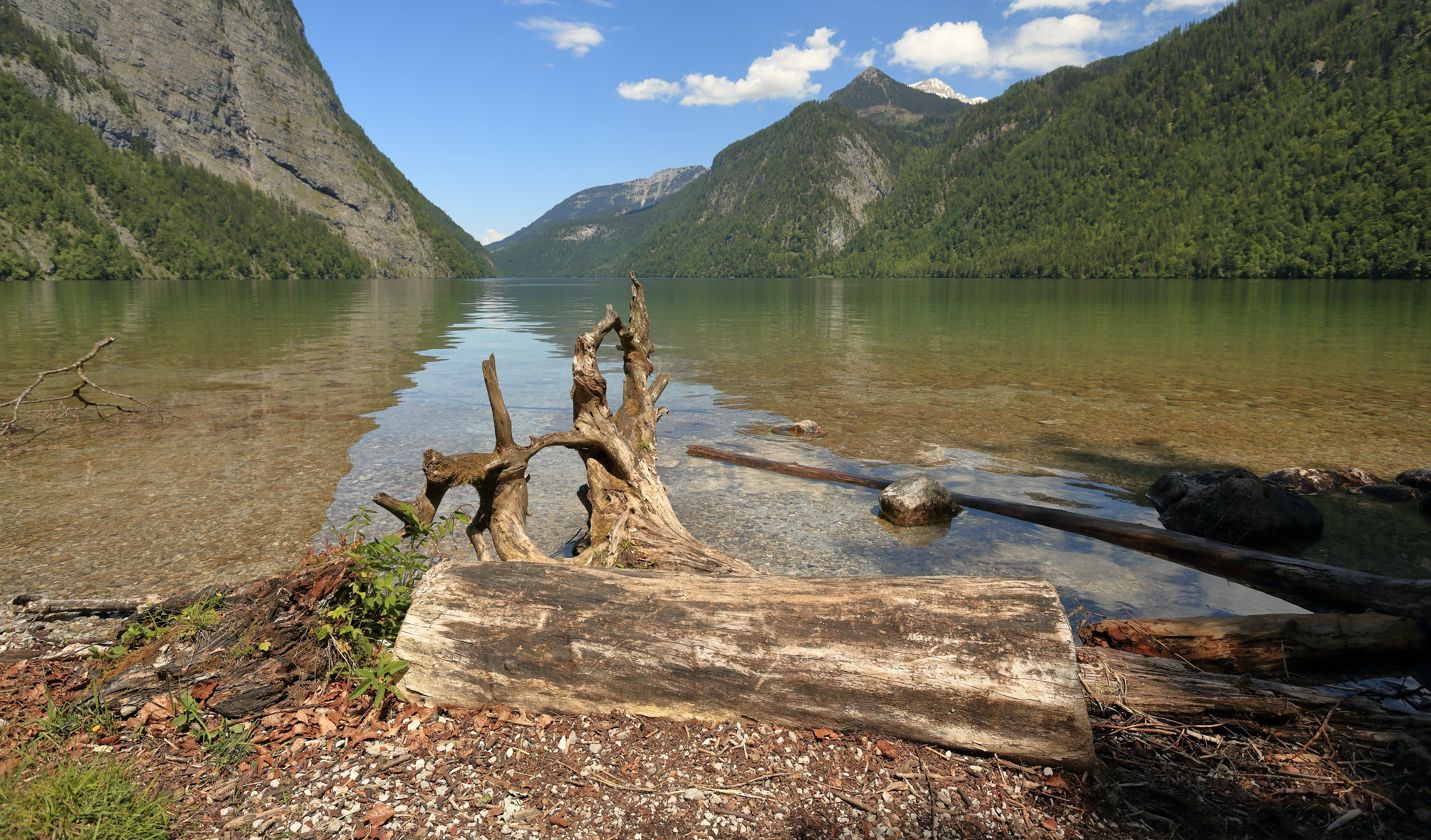
Impression of the lake as seen from Hirschau peninsula

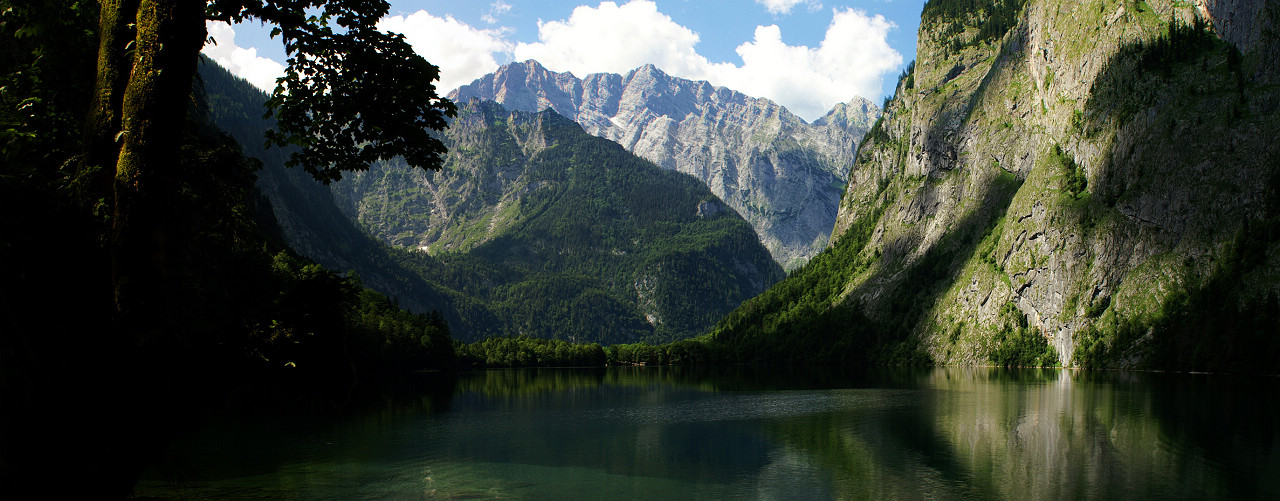
Obersee

== See also ==
- Königssee bobsleigh, luge, and skeleton track
