= Karl Heinisch =

German painter

Karl Adam Heinisch
- Born: 23 March 1847; Neustadt
- Died: 29 December 1923 (aged 76); Munich
- Education: Academy of Fine Arts, Munich
- Known for: Painting, drawing

Karl Adam Heinisch (23 March 1847 – 29 December 1923) was a German painter. He is known for his landscape paintings. Karl Heinisch was born in Neustadt (now Prudnik, Poland). On 4 May 1870 he started going to Academy of Fine Arts in Munich. He died in Munich. Sources disagree on his death date. Benezit Dictionary of Artists list is as "1910 or 1923", and RKD lists 29 December 1923 as a possible death date.

== Gallery ==
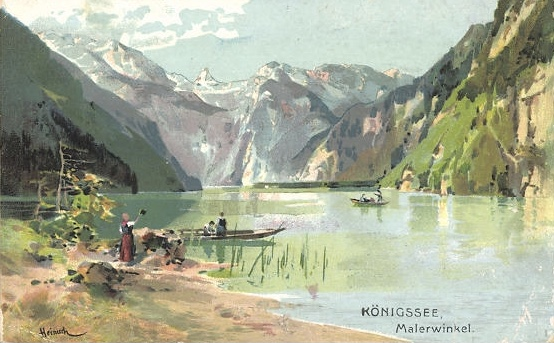
Königssee

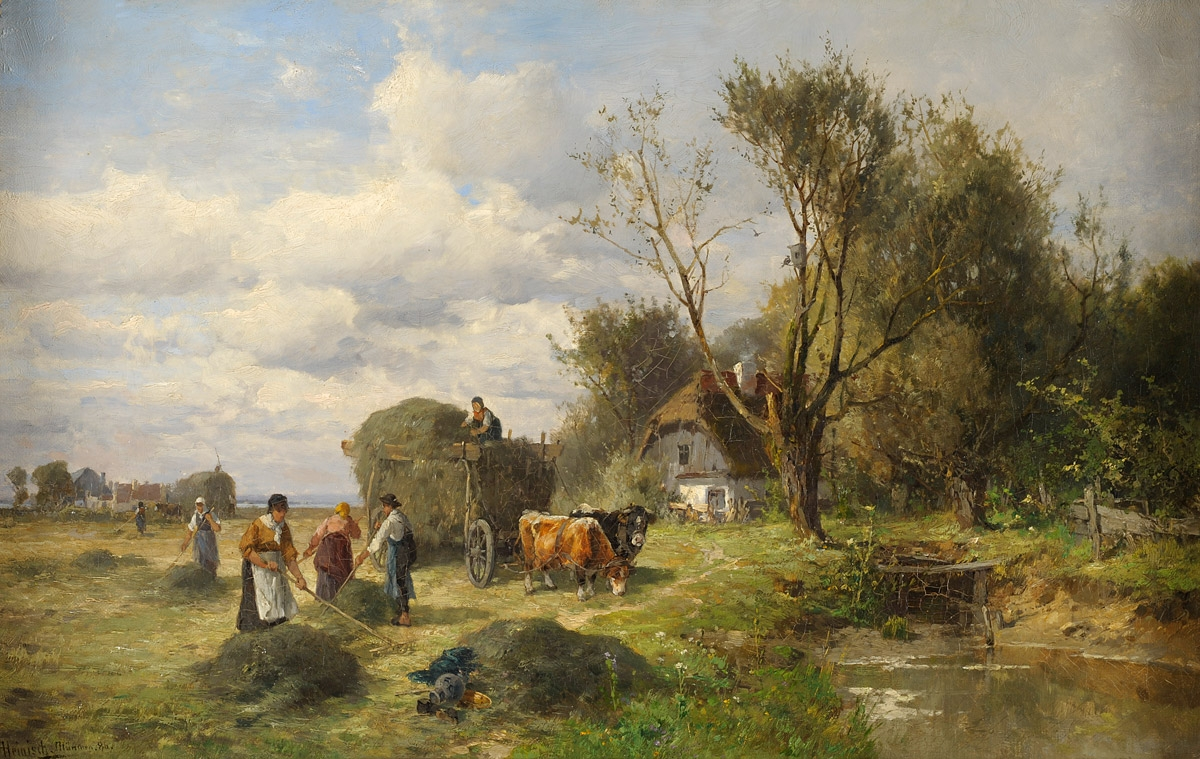

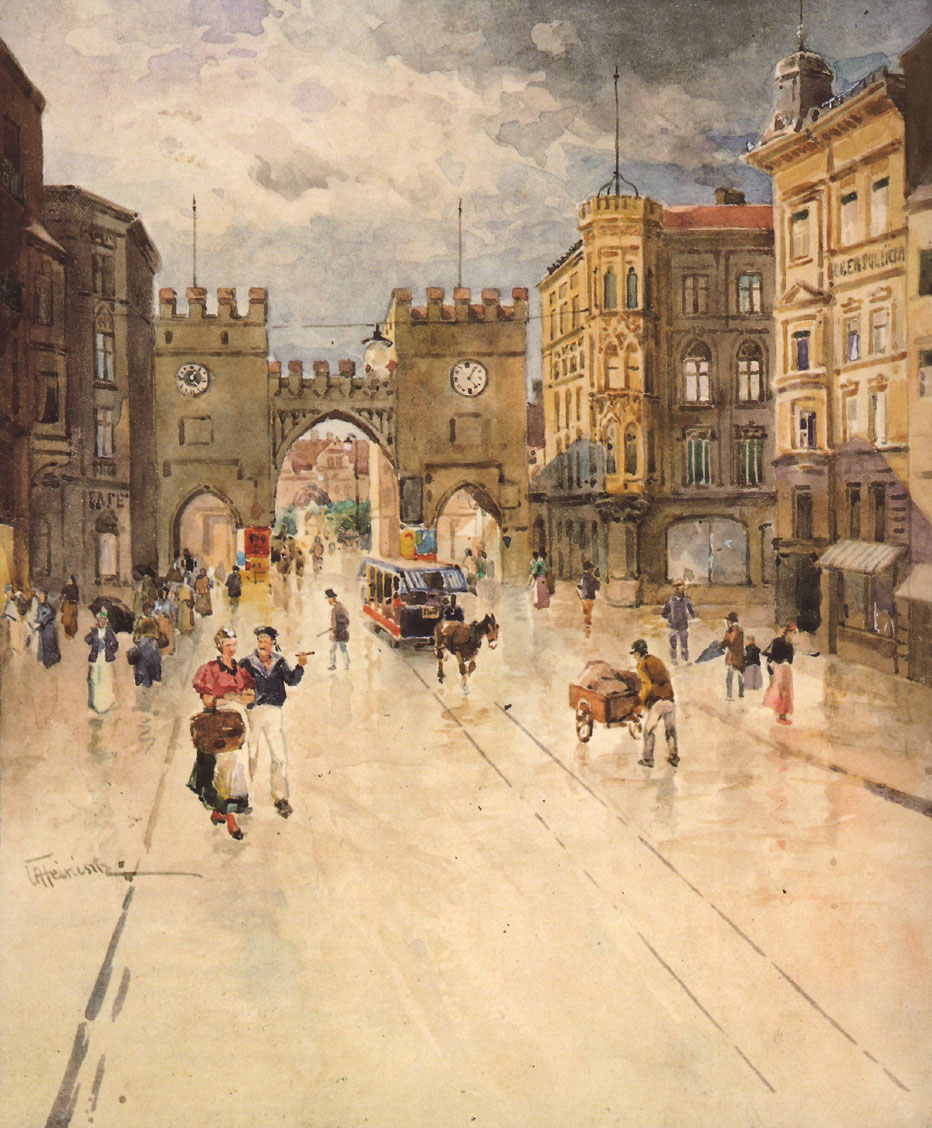

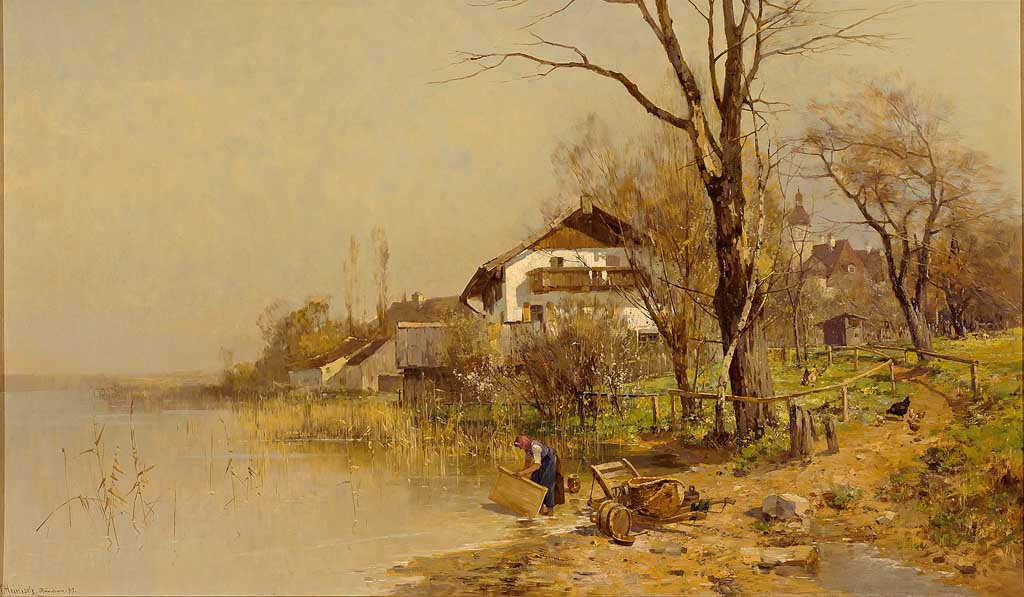

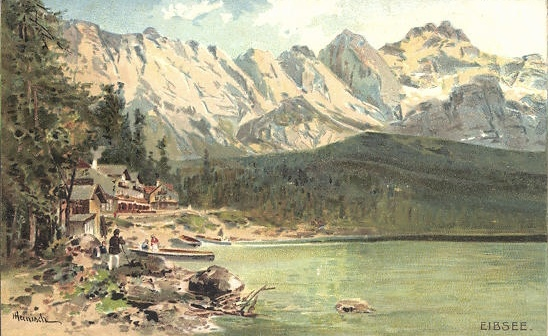
