= Schlüchtsee =

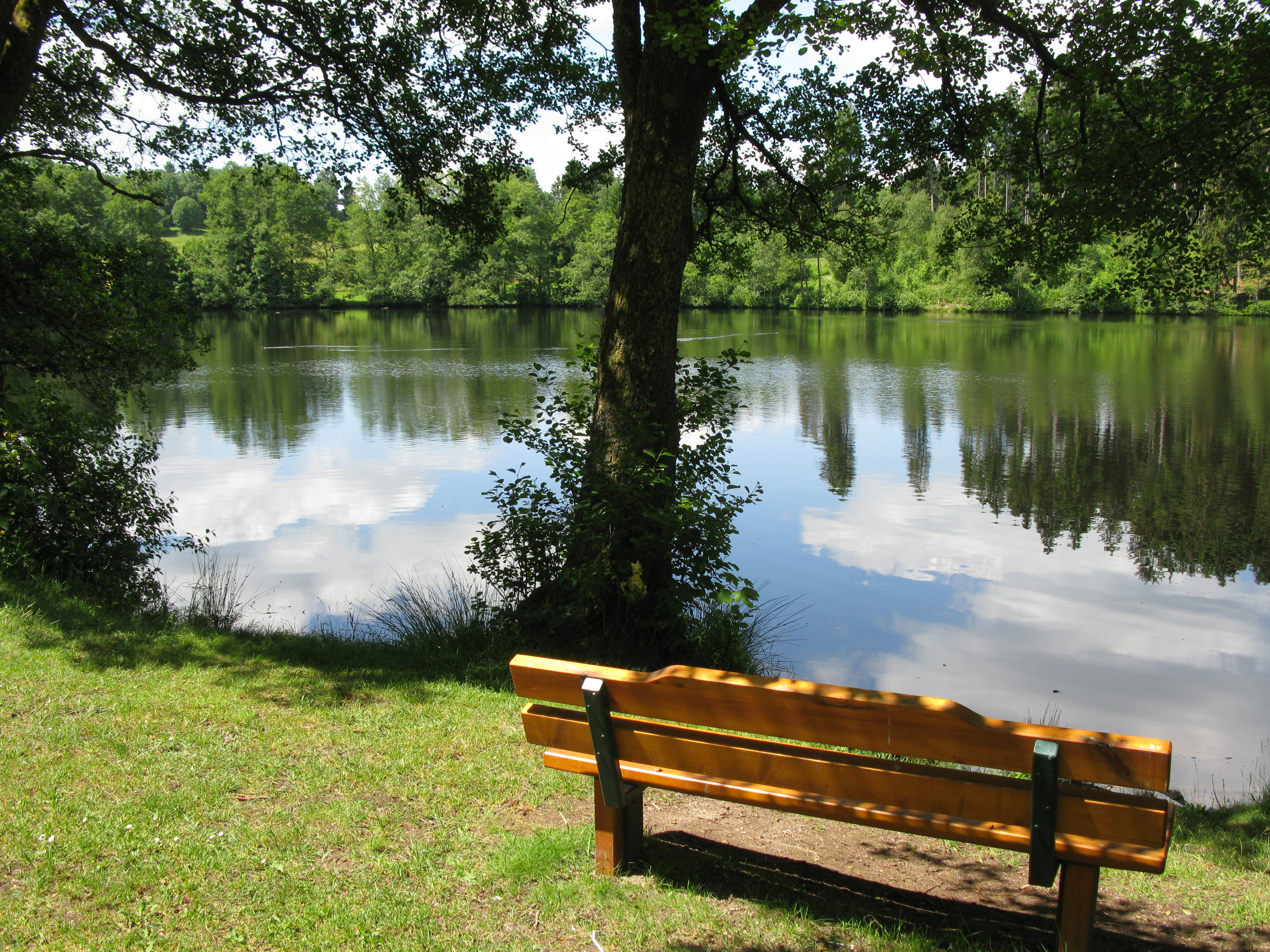

- Location within Germany
- Location: Waldshut, Germany
- Coordinates: 47°47′14″N 8°15′30″E
- Type: Artificial lake
- River sources: Schlücht River
- Max. length: 260 m (850 ft)
- Max. width: 230 m (750 ft)
- Surface area: 6 ha (15 acres)
- Max. depth: 5 m (16 ft)
- Shore length^{1}: 0.73 km (0.45 mi)
- Surface elevation: 914 m (2,999 ft)
- ^{1} Shore length is not a well-defined measure.

The Schlüchtsee is a small, artificial lake in the Southern Black Forest near Grafenhausen in the county of Waldshut in Germany, through which the River Schlücht flows.

== History and size ==
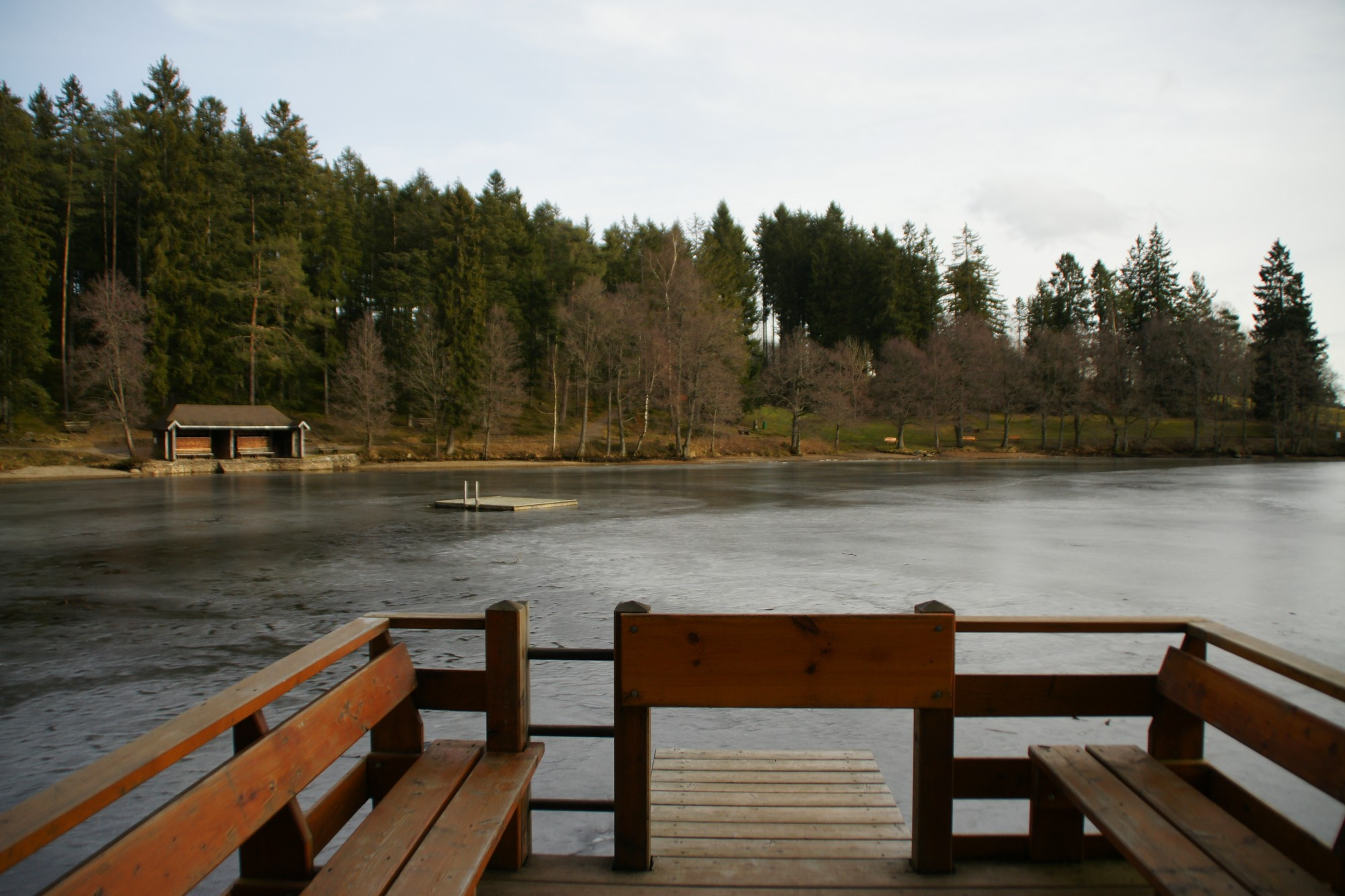
The Schlüchtsee with bathhouse and raft

In 1791, St. Blaise Abbey needed an ice pond for the nearby brewery in Rothaus and so the Schlücht was impounded. A textile dyers' was soon added which ran until the 1920s. The meadows were used for bleaching and the lake water for dyeing. Bathing was not introduced until the 20th century and was during this time that the little wooden bathing hut was built. With the development of the lake around 1920 by Swiss nobleman, Ernest of Adelsheim, the value of conservation, especially water lilies, was established. This was continued by the former tenant of the Schlüchtsee farm, Erich Gold. Today the water lilies are separated from the bathing area by logs, and the bathing beach also has a kiosk.

The area of the lake, which lies at a height of 914 metres (2,999 ft) above sea level immediately north of the Schlüchtsee farm between Grafenhausen and Rothaus, is about 6 hectares (15 acres) and it has a shoreline just under 0.73 kilometres (0.45 mi) in length. It is 260 metres (850 ft) across from north to south and 230 metres (750 ft) from east to west. It is up to 5 metres (16 ft) deep. The lake is popular for bathing and angling. A path runs past the lake to the Hüsli, named after Klausjürgen Wussow. The lake is part of a nature reserve, no. 3,032 covering 8.5 ha and known as the "Schlüchtsee", that was established on 11 October 1940.

== Literature ==
- Christian Neumann, Die Seen des Schwarzwaldes, 1978, ISBN 3-921340-34-9
- Rudolf Metz, Geologische Landeskunde des Hotzenwaldes, 1987 ISBN 3-7946-01742
- Regierungspräsidium Freiburg (publ.): Die Naturschutzgebiete im Regierungsbezirk Freiburg. Thorbecke, Stuttgart, 2011, ISBN 978-3-7995-5177-9
