= Hohenfeld (surname) =

Coat of arms of the Hohenfeld family

The Hohenfeld family (von Hohenfeld, Hohenfelder) is an ancient family of Austrian nobility, originally centered around Upper Austria. The family was extinguished in male line in 1824.

The name is variously spelled as (von) Hohenfeld, Höhenfeld, Hohenfeldt, Hochenfeld(en), Hochfeld, Hoenfelt, etc.

== History ==
=== Origins ===
According to notes compiled by Ludwig von Hohenfeld between 1625 and 1631, the Hohenfeld family would indirectly descend from "Adolsgerium Kuniboldi ex sanguine Herculis Alemani postremi germaniae regis filius filius" anno 493 (Adolsgerius, son of Chunibold, son of the last king of Germany Alemanus Hercules [de]). This Alemanus Hercules was a mythical king of Germany (besides an alleged founder of Bavaria and associated with Regensburg), whose popularity increased by the works of Johannes Aventinus that were published in the late 16th century.

At around the same time, in 1639, Conrad Kempff produced a genealogical tree of the family, where he traces back the roots of the family to a progenitor in the 11th century, Babo of Hochfeld (Hochenfeld), as one of the 32 legendary sons of Count Babo of Abensperg. The Babonids, Count Babo's direct ancestors and successors as Burggraves of Regensburg and surrounding possessions, were closely related and affiliated with the Babenberger and both descended from the Popponids (all named after the leading name Babo). The line of the Babonids were extinguished in 1196, after which their goods were appropriated by the Counts of Wittelsbach in the early 13th century. According to Kempff, the descendants of Babo of Hochfeld stayed in Bavaria until about 1200 after which they migrated from Bavaria to Austria; this migration may have been caused by the loss of their Babonid protectors.

No evidence of the supposed descent from the Babonids exists, let alone of Adolsgerius. (Note: See the coat of arms section, under similarities, over the similarities of the Babones, the Hohenfelder, and other houses' arms with the roses.) Notably, these claims were recorded in a period where the family had to prove their ancient rights in juridical efforts to reclaim their confiscated goods during the counter-reformation and their exile from Austria.

In this unattested "Bavarian" period, the Hohenfeld would have married into several leading noble Bavarian houses (Neuburg, Wolfratshausen, Traun, Haag, Hirschhorn, Lamberg, Eurasberg).

=== Early history ===
The family (re)appeared in Austria in the early 13th century. Around the year 1220, the founder of a short-lived junior branch, Heinrich von Hohenfeld zu Stiela, was mentioned as a Cammer-Juncker for the Babenberger Dukes of Styria. The Babenberger (being possibly related to the Hohenfelder) could have provided a refuge, after the appropriation of the Babonid goods by the Wittelsbach. From the early 13th century onwards, the main branch of the Hohenfeld family – Heinrich's elder brother Georg and his son Otto I von Hohenfeld (about 1245–1328) – settled in St Georgen im Attergau in Upper Austria, also under control of the Babenberger dukes. This is the main branch from whom the uninterrupted line of the Hohenfeld family can be traced back.

A record referring to an Ulreich von Hohenfeld, as noted in the Genealogisches Handbuch des Adels, is dated to 1 May 1291, but this Ulreich can as of yet not be linked.

Strnad (1868) theorized that the brothers or cousins Ulreich and Otto de Hohenwelden were in fact of local origin and descended from the Lords of Wasen (also known as Counts of Attersee or the Chamer/Kamer) in the Attergau region; they would simply have changed their names. However, this theory seems to have been based mostly on the names Ulreich and Otto, while no castle or toponym relating to Hohenfeld or Hochfeld can be attributed that would explain the change of name.

The family belonged to the ranks of the lower nobility at first. But over the centuries, they acquired many lands and held important offices in Austria and in the German lands. The family intermarried among the twelve so-called "Apostle Houses", such as the Traun, Polheim [de], Jörger, and Zinzendorf. They were known as ministeriales of the Counts of Schaunberg, from whom they acquired Castle Edramsberg in 1472.

Christoph von Hohenfeld (died 1496) joined the Mailberger Bund [de] in 1451, alongside Ulrich von Eyczing [de] and Ulrich of Celje, against Frederick III.

Two notable family members from this period are:

- Lucia von Hohenfeld married Calixtus Ottomanus (~1448-1496) in 1474, a supposed son of Sultan Murad II and half-brother of Sultan Mehmed the Conqueror, who was baptized by Pope Calixtus III in 1456.
- Christoph von Hohenfeld (1465-1520) won Holy Roman Emperor Frederick III's trust with his role as burggrave and later vogt of the castle of Wels and Vienna. He was elevated to the rank of Baron (Freiherr) on 5 January 1484, but his title fell into disuse and the diploma itself was lost in 1620. Achaz Hohenfelder even forbade his sons to aspire to the lordship, ‘for arrogance would avert the blessing of God and the propagation of the family.’

=== Reformation ===
Protestantism spread rapidly in Austria, triggered by its adoption by the local nobility. The Hohenfelder, to begin with Wolfgang von Hohenfeld (1505-1568), were affiliated with the nucleus of Protestant nobility from an early phase. Wolfgang was head of the only extant branch of the Hohenfeld family by that time. He was befriended with some of the most influential Protestant nobles such as Jörg von Perkheim (~1485-1559) and Christoph II Jörger von Tollet (~1502-~1578). The former of these happened to be Wolfgang's closest aristocratic neighbor, and the latter was an early Protestant convert who had studied under Martin Luther and returned to Austria as a propagator of Protestantism.

Wolfgang's only surviving son, Achaz von Hohenfeld (~1535-1603), studied in Wittenberg in 1557 and in Tübingen under Philip Melanchthon in 1561. Returning to Austria, he became an inspector of a collegiate school in 1571 and was known as 'the Lutheran Pope'. He became involved, among others, with Jakob Andreae.

After Achaz' death in 1603, the Hohenfeld titles, goods, and Protestant legacy were passed on to his sons Otto, Wolfgang, Ludwig, Christoph, Michael, and Rudolph – born between 1575 and 1585. The Hohenfeld did not sign the League of Horn [de] in 1608, but continued to be related and affiliated to many of its signers, consisting of influential Protestant nobles. (Note: For instance, Otto von Hohenfeld (1574-1620) attended a wedding in 1613 with a strong Horner Bund affiliation) After the major Protestant defeat at the Battle of White Mountain and the ensuing end of the Bohemian Revolt in 1620, counter-reformation pressure began to increase in Upper Austria.

All children of Achaz were impacted following 1620 by the counter-reformation :

- Otto (1574-1620), the eldest son, and his wife, Anna Maria von Geymann Gallspach [de] (1590-1621) died in Linz in 1620 and 1621, respectively.
  - Their only surviving son, the orphan Otto Achaz (1614-1685) was placed under a forced guardianship of Johann-Ludwig Count von Kufstein [de] and converted to Catholicism in 1636. Although he married twice, no children are known.

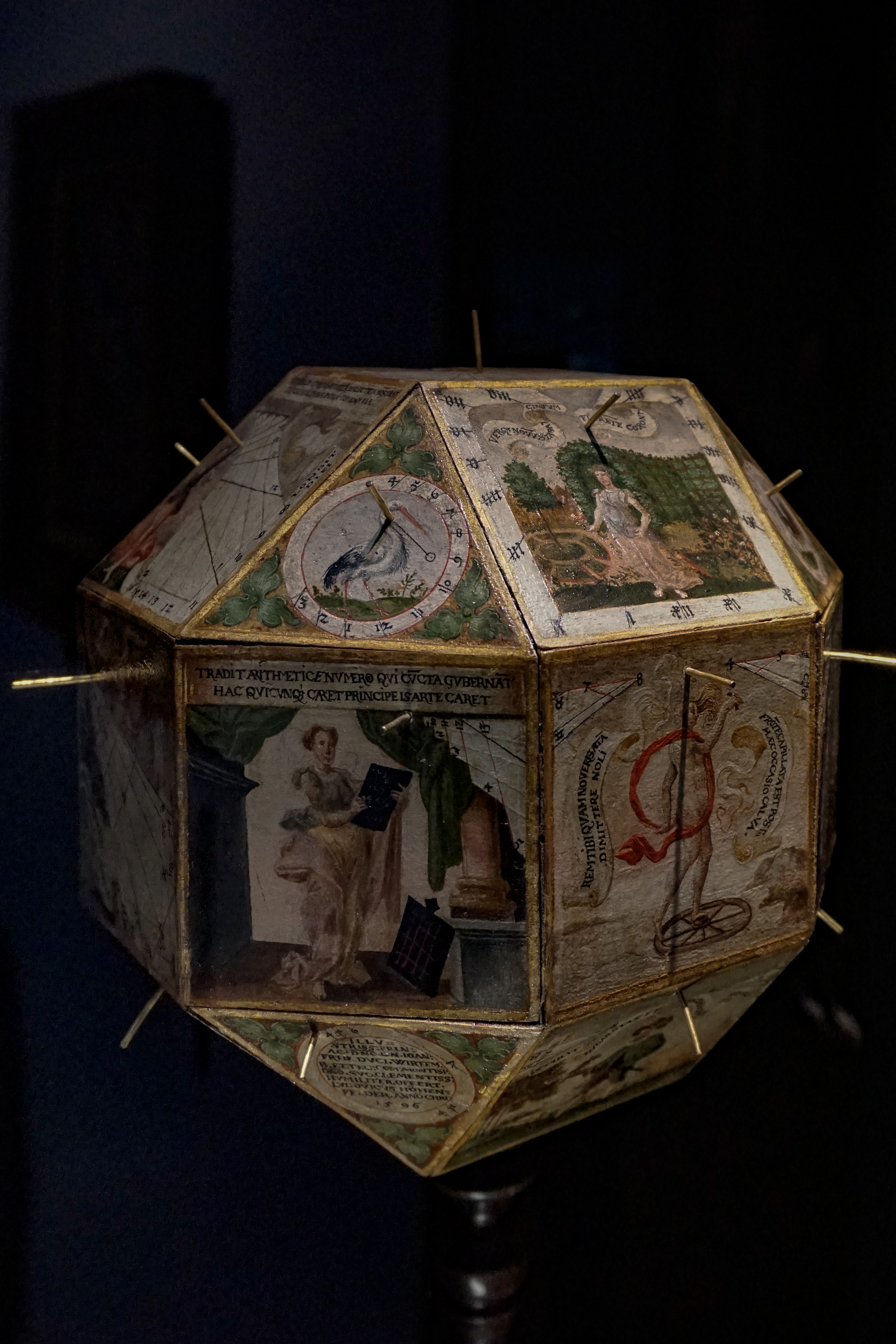
A polyhedral sundial by Ludwig von Hohenfeld (1576-1644), from 1596, with 17 different sudials for the region between Tubingen and Stuttgart - Landesmuseum Württemberg in Stuttgart read more

- Wolfgang (1575-~1613) died before the events in 1620, and nothing is known about his only son Heinrich, born about 1603.
- Ludwig (1576-1644), lord of Weidenholz, married to Clara von Neydeck (1582/83-1655), befriended and influenced by Johannes Valentinus Andreae (grandson of aforementioned Jakob Andreae). In 1625, Ludwig was forced to flee to Andreae's home in Württemberg, and, in 1635, to sell his possessions at Weidenholz (near Waizenkirchen).
  - His daughter Katharina (1608-1665) describes the family's mood while in exile in Esslingen "Our dear father should have experienced it more blessedly; [God] has brought him into the ditches. [...] My brother [Achaz] can't believe how he feels, he can't even cry about it."
  - His son Achaz (1610-1672) [de] rose to a prominent position at the court in Nassau-Diez, but eventually converted to Catholicism 1669 after his marriage to the catholic Anna-Ursula von Metternich-Winneburg, and his offspring remained catholic. His descendants held many positions throughout Germany, but his known male line died out in the 18th century.
  - Another son, Wolfgang (1616-1679), ended up with the lordship of Binningen in Switzerland, through an inheritance of his wife, a Polheim-Wartemburg, but his line ended with his son Carl Ludwig.

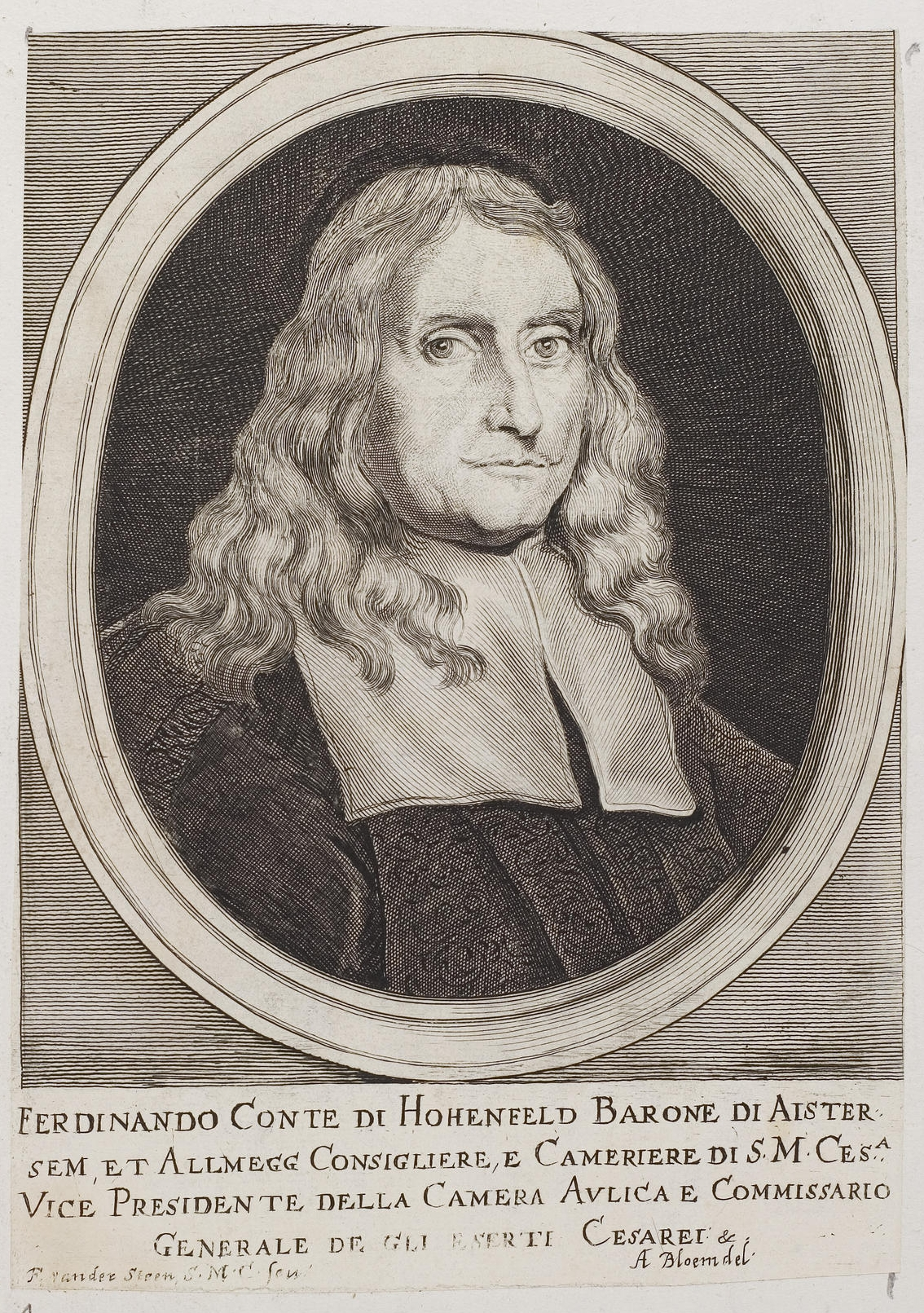
Ferdinand von Hohenfeld (1612–1675), Count, Imperial Privy Council, Vice-President of the Exchequer and General War Commissioner

- Markus (1577-1618), lord of Almegg, Eitzing and Wildenberg, and his offspring converted to Catholicism and remained in Upper Austria.
  - His eldest surviving son, Ferdinand (1612–1675), took over the family possessions in Upper Austria and was elevated to Imperial Count in 1669. This line became the main line until the family's patrilineal extinction in 1824.
- Christoph (1580-1631), lord of Aistersheim, Almegg, and Peuerbach; so therefore in charge of the most important ancestral titles. He was married to Sidonia von Zinzendorf und Pottendorf (~1584-1640), a granddaughter of Sigismund von Polheim [de], another important Protestant leader (1531–1598), and Potentiane von Hohenfeld, a distant cousin of Sidonia's husband. About 1620, the family flees Austria as an Exulant [de], first to Sulzbach and later (on the enemy's approach of that town) to Wunsiedel. The family castle at Aistersheim is plundered by Tilly's troops in 1620 while on their way to Bohemia to fight in the Battle of White Mountain, and the castle's commander is beheaded and the garrison hanged. In 1625, Christoph gives up his claims on Peuerbach and he dies indebted in 1631. His wife Sidonia moves to Regensburg and dies there as well in 1640.
  - Their twelve or more children are mostly unaccounted for. One son, Sigmund von Hohenfeld, still lives in Wunsiedel in 1686 when he writes a letter to Markgrave Christian Ernst von Brandenburg-Bayreuth. Another son, August von Hohenfeld (1620-1642), dies in military service in 1642. His descendants supposedly survived into the 20th century in Elbing. Furthermore, 19th century Victor Hohlfeld in Dresden (Note: Karl Victor Hohlfeld (1844-1915) was an historian and coin-collector from Saxony, who coined a medal in Dresden in 1876 with the Hohenfeld coat of arms, engraved with Familien Wappen, Devise: Erkenne Dich Selbst, and Das Geschlechts Hohlfeld aus Sachsen, Dresden 1876) as well as the 18th century Danish-Norwegian von Hoelfdeldt family (Note: This family was originally Hohlfeld from Halle and later Spandau, with family relations with Francke and Zinzendorf. One family member, Lt.-Col. Johan Nathanael von Hoelfeldt (1703-1787), ended up in Norway after he left Francke's Pietist Latin School and enlisted in the Danish-Norwegian army to fight. He is reported to have told his sons that his father's father was a count Hohenfeldt or Hohlenfeldt, who was banished or driven out of his homeland as a Protestant in the Thirty Years' War, had abandoned his titles and moved to Brandenburg, whose own father in turn had perished in the War of Religion (E. A. Thomle, Familien Holfeldt (Hoelfeldt) i Norge (1898), pp. 66).) claimed descent from Christoph von Hohenfeld.
- Nothing is known about the last two sons, Michael (born 1683) and Rudolph (born around 1685), and they could have died at a young age.

=== Later history ===
Only one branch of the family had remained in Austria after around 1620, namely the branch of Markus von Hohenfeld (1577-1618) and his branch would endure the longest. After his and his siblings' conversion to Catholicism, Markus' eldest son Ferdinand (1612-1675) was confirmed in his knighthood on 28 July 1652 with the title of Austrian Freiherr. This was followed, on 7 March 1669, by an elevation to the rank of Imperial Count, which was later enhanced by a further ennoblement of his son Otto Heinrich (1650-1719) to the rank of Austrian Count on 24 December 1714. Ferdinand's younger brother Wolf Ludwig (1615-...) would produce a younger line next to Ferdinand's comital line, which would survive for another three generations into the 18th century.

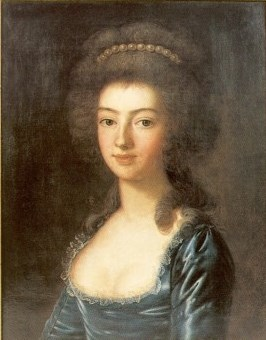
Countess Maria Anna von Hohenfeld (1768-1848), princess of Esterházy de Galántha, was one of the last members of the family

Ferdinand's comital line was continued with his son Otto Heinrich, then by Otto Ferdinand Felix (1674-1741) and afterwards by his son Otto Karl Maximilian (1704-1772).

The latter, Otto Karl Maximilian von Hohenfeld, had two sons and a daughter:

- Otto Franz (1731-1776), married to Maria Anna Franziska von Stain zu Jettingen:
  - Lieutenant field marshal Otto Adolph Karl Johann (1764-1824), who fought Napoleon at Aspern-Essling and commanded a division at Wagram, and who would be the last male line descendant
  - Maria Anna Theresia (1767-1848, married to Antal Pál Esterházy and later to Charles Philip, Prince of Schwarzenberg)
  - Maria Franziska (1771-1831, married to Georg Joseph von Waldstein-Wartenberg)
  - Maria Karolina (1774-1858, married to József Ferenc Pálffy ab Erdöd), who would finally be the last living descendant of the family.
- Feldzeugmeister Otto Philipp von Hohenfeld (1733-1799) [de], married to Maria Therese Kinsky:
  - Otto Franz Joseph (1766-1796) without progeny
  - Maria Antonia (1770-1804), married to Joseph von Bolza (1764-1834)
  - Maria Josepha (1775-...), married to Anton Franz Engl von Wagrain (1768-1827)
- Maria Anna Theresia (1742-1814), married to Johann Emmerich von Keyserling

The Napoleonic Wars caused the last major developments around the family. In July 1809, Otto Adolph Karl Johann von Hohenfeld was promoted to lieutenant field marshal after he had distinguished himself in the victorious Battle of Aspern, together with Radetzky. Also in 1809, Aistersheim and the Innviertel region came to Bavaria until 1814. On 7 October 1813, the remaining members of the extant line were registered as bavarian knights (Ritter), in addition to its comital titles in Austria.

The male family line was finally extinguished in 1824 with the death of Otto Adolph Karl Johann on 14 May 1824 in Linz. His four sisters sold the lordship and domain to Johann Karl Dworzak in 1830, whose descendants would continue to own Castle Aistersheim until the second half of the 20th century. The last sister and therefore the final Hohenfeld, Maria Karolina, would die in 28 July 1858.

== Coat of Arms ==
=== Blazon ===
The pronominal arms of the von Hohenfeld are blazoned azure, a fess argent charged with a rose gules.

The Hohenfelder inherited the Symaninger titles and lands in the 13th century and quartered their own rose arms, in the second and third position, with theirs (sable, two horns argent with backs to each other facing downwards roped gules and banded or), in the first and fourth position. (Note: This 13th century quartering took place relatively early and was maintained unchanged throughout the centuries even after their elevation to Counts. The positioning of the Symaningen arms in the most important location has led to the speculation that the attribution was reversed and these were in fact the actual original Hohenfeld arms. However, since the Hohenfeld occasionally chose to use only their rose arms (e.g. Christof v Hochenfeld in Wappenbuch Neustift (1558)), this speculation seems unlikely.)

After Achaz von Hohenfeld (~1491-1545) married Esther von Albrechtshaim (died 1557), the last in her line, he and his descendants inescutcheoned the arms of the Albrechtshaim family onto his own arms. However, Achaz' branch of the Hohenfeld family ended with his children and the other branches did not take over the inescutcheon (although the castle of Almegg, inherited from the Albrechtshaimer, did pass to their possession). The coat of arms of the Albrechtshaim was Or, a griffin sable langued gules.

==== Similarities ====
A comparison of various coats of arms attributed to the Babonids and affiliated families

There is some similarity between the pronominal arms of the Hohenfelder (a single rose on a fess) and their alleged progenitors, the Babonids (three roses on a bend). Several arms of other noble houses claiming descent from the Babonids, as well as various castles and monasteries associated with them, also bear similarities (roses on a fess/per fess/a bend/per bend).

The Babonids, who produced two Minnesänger (authors of love songs and poems in which roses were often a theme), seemed to have been associated with roses, having founded various abbeys and towns such as Rosenburg [de] and Rosenheim, on top of their attributed arms.

If there is any linkage at all, the differences between the arms could be explained by the extinction of the Babonids in proto-heraldic or very early heraldic times namely 1196, where coats of arms were more fluidly defined and colors and shapes could vary.

=== Gallery ===
Full coat of arms of the Hohenfelder as used since the 13th century, here with comital crowns

Full coat of arms of the Hohenfelder with inescutcheon of the Albrechtsheimer

Pronominal arms of the Hohenfelder

Pronominal arms of the Symaninger that were quartered with the Hohenfelder pronominal arms in the 13th century

Coat of arms of Wolfgang von Hohenfeld Binningen (1616-1679), the only known deviation from the regular arms

=== Depictions ===
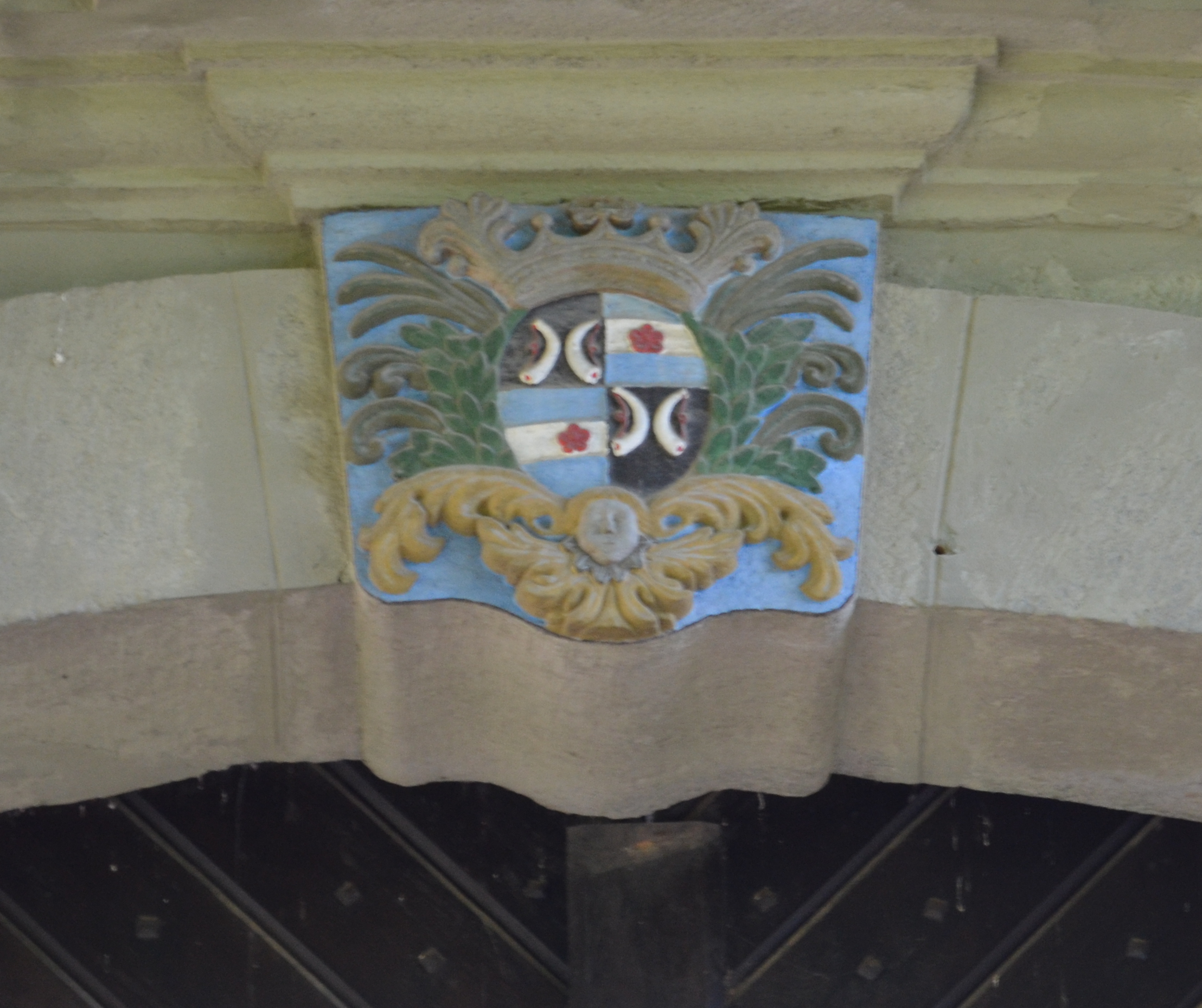
Coat of arms on Hof zu Hausen [de] near the Eisenbach

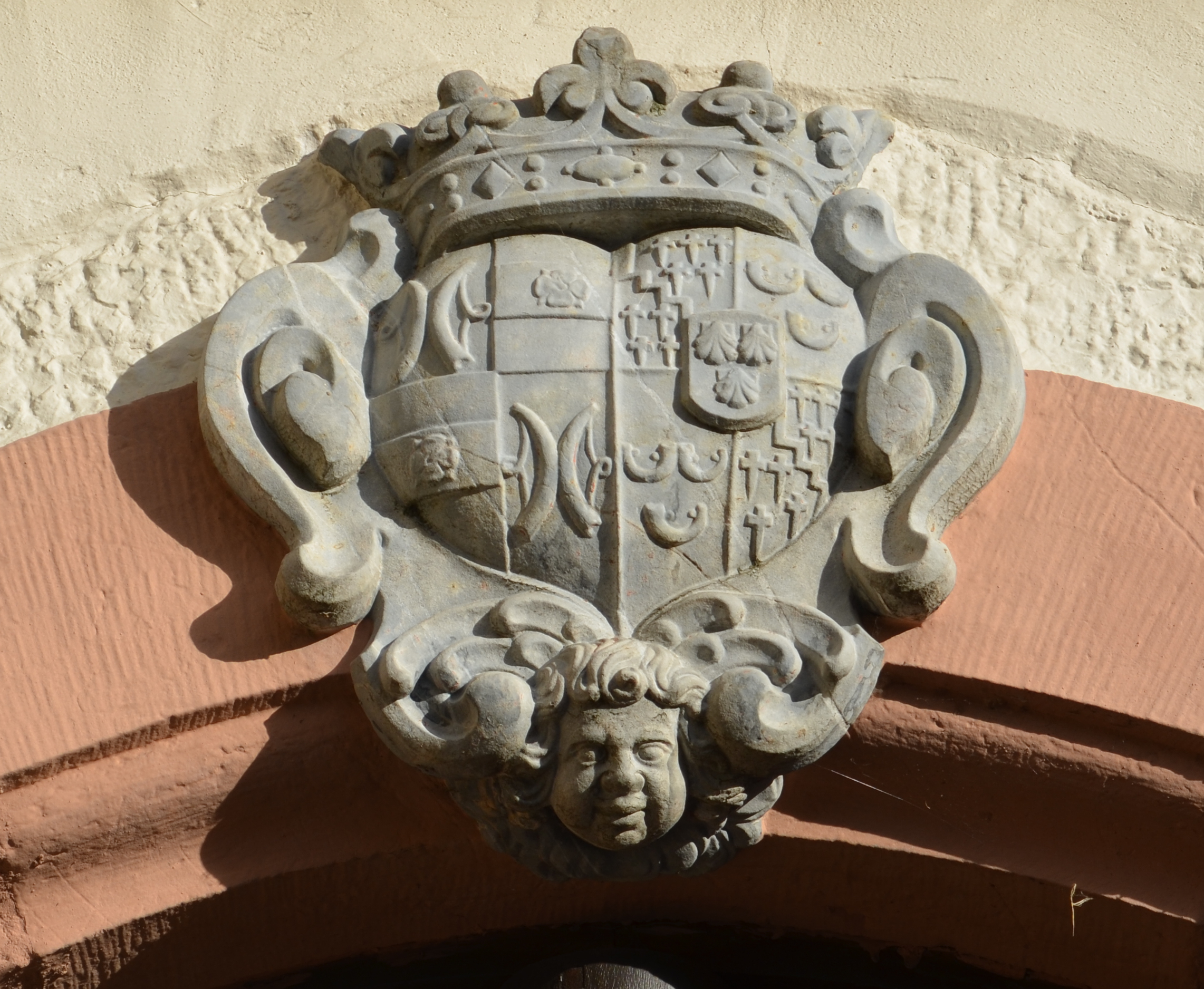
Arms of alliance of the Hohenfelder and the Metternich-Winneburger at the Hohenfeld Chapel in Bad Camberg

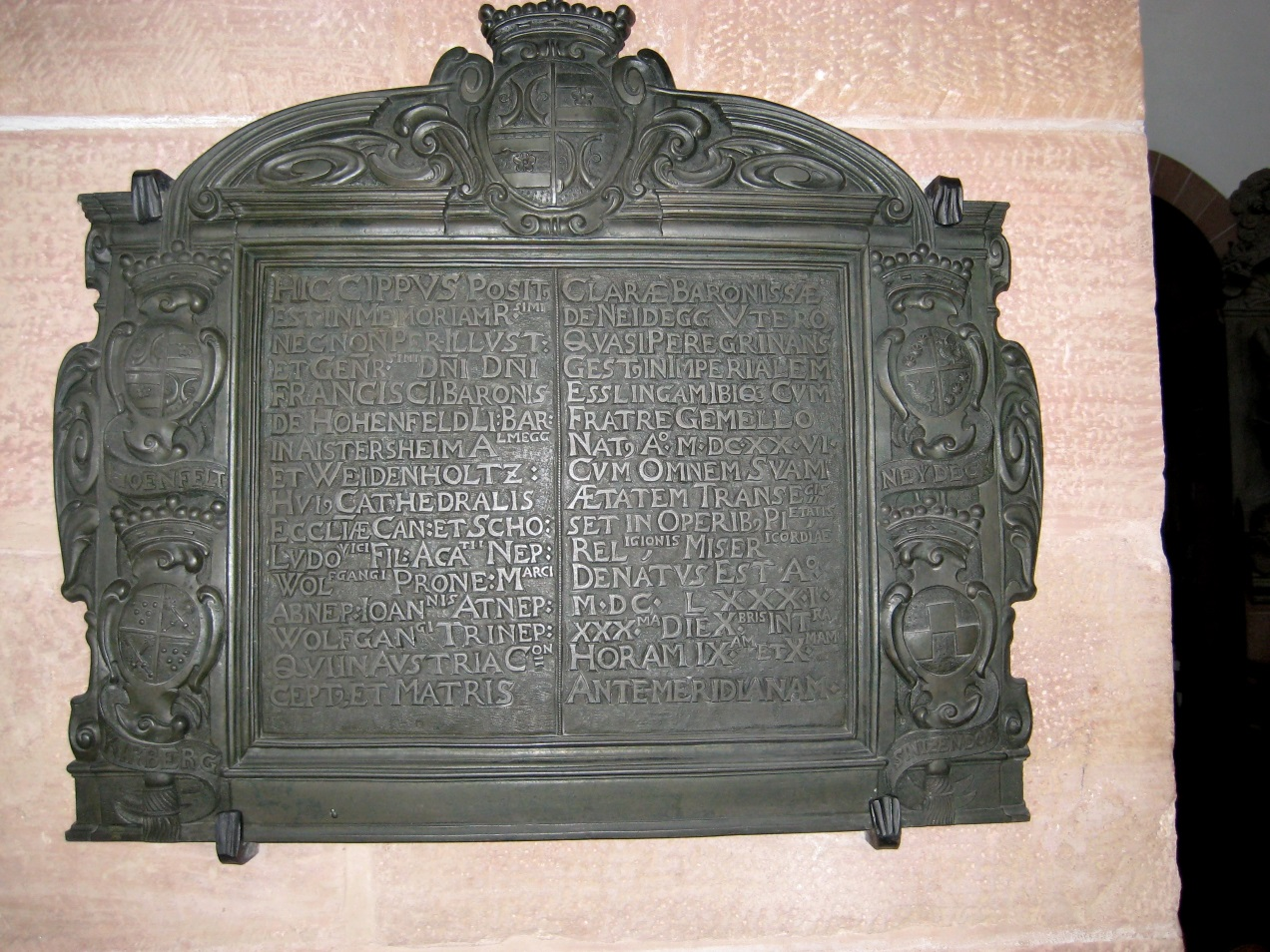
Bronze epitaph of Franz von Hohenfeld (here spelled as Hoenfelt) in the Collegiate Church in Aschaffenburg

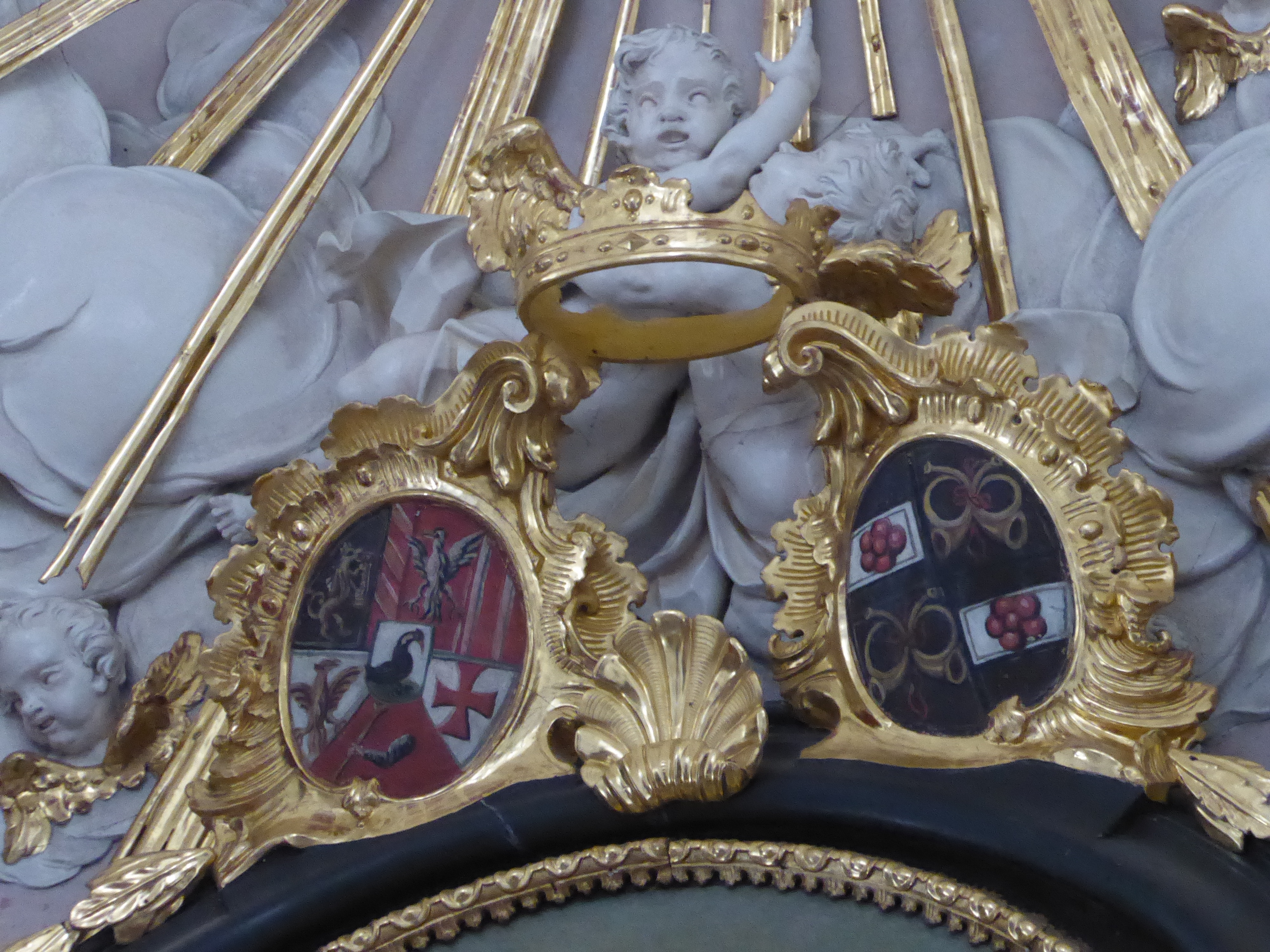
Cartouche in the Parish church at Wagram with the arms of alliance of the Hardegg and Hohenfelder

== Notable family members ==
- Ludwig von Hohenfeld (1576–1644)
- Achatius von Hohenfeld [de] (1610–1672), Imperial and Electorial Bavarian Lieutenant-Colonel, President of the Chamber of the Electorate of Trier
- Franz Carl Friedrich von Hohenfeld [de] (1696–1757), Dean of Worms Cathedral and Governor of the Prince-Bishopric
- Otto Philipp von Hohenfeld [de] (1733–1799), Imperial Field Engineer
- Otto Ignaz Adam Karl von Hohenfeld (1662–1726), Austrian Generalfeldwachtmeister
- Otto Adolf Karl Johann von Hohenfeld (1764–1824), Austrian Lieutenant field marshal

== Residences ==
=== Main residences ===
Residence	Location	Acquired	Key Events	Lost	Picture
Wasserschloss Aistersheim [de] website	Upper Austria	1443: Inherited by Johann I (Hanns I) von Hohenfeld's (1385-1464) through his marriage to heiress Anna von Aisterheim	1600: Finished extension renovation works. 1620: Attacked and taken by Tilly. 1626: Served as Peasants' headquarters during the Peasant War, and subsequently burned. 1771: A fire causes heavy damage	1830: Sold to Johann Carl Dworzak	
Schloss Almegg or Talmeck [de]	Upper Austria	~1535: Given to Achaz von Hohenfeld (~1491-1545) by the Albrechtsheimer as a wedding gift on his marriage to heiress Esther von Albrechtsheim (1517-1557)		1808: Sold by Otto von Hohenfeld to Franz Foret von Breitenfeld in 1808	
Schloss Peuerbach [de]	Upper Austria	1593: Bought by Achaz von Hohenfeld (1551-1603) from Georg Achaz von Starhemberg		1626: Taken over by Wolf Siegmund von Herberstein [de]	
Wasserschloss Weidenholz [de]	Upper Austria	1612: Bought by the brothers Hohenfeld from Christine von Losenstein (married to heir Wolfgang Bergheimer) and allotted to Ludwig von Hohenfeld (1576-1644)		1635: Sold by Ludwig, due to his exile, to Hans Ludwig von Kueffstein [de] (an Imperial commander who converted to Catholicism in 1627)	

=== Other residences ===
Residence	Location	Acquired	Key Events	Lost	Picture
Schloss Schlüßlberg [de]	Upper Austria	1429: Bought or inherited by Erasmus von Hohenfeld (~1400-1461) from his mother's (Agnes Schifer) family		1472: Sold by Erasmus' son Christoph von Hohenfeld (~1465-~1520) to Christoff Jörger [de]	
Burg Schönering [de]	Upper Austria	1443: Inherited by Johann I von Hohenfeld (1385-1464) through his marriage to heiress Anna von Aisterheim		1477: Destroyed in 1477	
Burg Edramsberg [de]	Upper Austria	1472: Acquired by Christoph von Hohenfeld (~1465-~1520) from its previous owners von Schaunberg	1477: Destroyed by the troops of Christoph I von Liechtenstein but reaffirmed to Christoph von Hohenfeld by the Bisshop of Passau in 1484	After 1477: Fell into disrepair	
Schloss Kirchberg am Walde [de]	Lower Austria	1489: Acquired by the Hohenfelder from the lords of Kirchberg		1555: Acquired by Dietmar von Losenstein [de]	
Schloss Radeck [de]	Salzburg area	~1520: Acquired by Erasmus von Hohenfeld (Canon of Passau) for his relative Margarete Saurer to live	1525: Set afire and damaged during the German Peasants' War	~1550: Acquired by Paul Rettinger some time after the war	
Schloss Rosenegg [de]	Upper Austria	~1525: Bought by Achaz von Hohenfeld (~1491-1545)		~1537: Sold by Achaz von Hohenfeld to Hanns von der Pruckhen	
Schloss Obereitzing [de]	Upper Austria	1602: Inherited by Achaz von Hohenfeld (1551-1603) through his mother Rosina von Paumgarten's (1523-1568) family		1638: Sold by one of Achaz' exiled Protestant sons to Johann Adolf von Tattenbach	
Schloss Wildenhag [de]	Upper Austria	1614: Left to Marx von Hohenfeld (1577-1618) by Georg Hutstocker	~1620: Loaned by Marx' sons Ferdinand (1612-1675) and Wolf Ludwig (1615-...) from their exiled Protestant uncle Ludwig von Hohenfeld (1576-1644)	1635: Sold by Ludwig (1576-1644), due to his exile	
Burg Wildenstein [de]	Upper Austria	1615: Listed among Christoph von Hohenfeld's (1580-1631) possessions		after 1615	
Schloss Egeregg [de]	Linz	1615: Bought by Christoph von Hohenfeld (1580-1631) from Michael Pittersdorfer von Freyhof		1622 and 1630: Sold in two phases by Christoph, due to his exile, to Constantin Grundemann von Falkenberg	
Burg Reichenstein [de]	Upper Austria	~1616: Probably bought by Christoph von Hohenfeld (1580-1631) after the previous owner's (Hans von Haim's [de], 1544-1616) death		?	
Schloss Walterskirchen [de]	Lower Austria	1666: Taken over by Ferdinand von Hohenfeld (1612-1675) after being destroyed in 1645 during the Thirty Years' War	1683: Rebuilt by his son Otto Heinrich von Hohenfeld (1650-1719)	1733: Acquired by the counts of Koháry	
Freihaus Hohenfeld [de]	Old City of Linz	1680: Acquired from the Lords of Polheim [de]		1786: Sold as civic property	
Schloss Gobelsburg [de]	Lower Austria	1693: Inherited by Otto Ferdinand Felix von Hohenfeld (1674-1741)	1725: Modernized by Otto Achaz Ehrenreich von Hohenfeld	1740: Sold by his son Heinrich to the Cistercian Abbey of Zwettl	
Schloss Hirschstetten [de]	Vienna	1693: Constructed for Otto Ferdinand Felix von Hohenfeld (1674-1741)		1713: Passed partially dilapidated to Prince Count Adam Franz von Schwarzenberg	

== Schematic family trees ==
This is a family tree of the Hohenfeld family. This family tree only includes male scions of the House of Habsburg from its supposed inception around 1000 and its extinction in 1824.

=== Early Hohenfelds ===
The following unproven and largely unattested genealogy has been mostly adapted from Joh. Max Humbracht (1707):

Babo von Abensberg ⚭ N.N.
Babo I ⚭ N.N.
Heinrich I died ~1102 ⚭ N.N.
Heinrich von Formbach-Neuburg ⚭ Gertrud	Johann I died young	Luitfridt died ~1125 ⚭ N.N.
Georg I died 1160 ⚭ Kunegund von Wolfratshausen	Babo II died 1167 ⚭ Maria von Haag
Georg II died ~1172	Otto von Hohenfeld von Waasen died ~1180 (Note: Otto von Hohenfeld is referenced have been Lord of Waasen, likely referring to Waasen in Grieskirchen in Upper Austria, an early indicator of the family's definitive settling in Austrian territories. He was married to a Traun, of the Austrian 'Apostle Houses', i.e. the families which had already played a historical role during the period of Babenberg rule of Austria (976 to 1246).) ⚭ Juliana von Traun	Martha	Rüdiger I died ~1194 ⚭ Gertrud N.N.	Georg von Hirschhorn ⚭ Sabina
Reimprecht	Georg III ⚭ N.N.	Heinrich von Lamberg ⚭ Euphemia	Heinrich II
Georg IV ⚭ Afra von Eurasberg	Heinrich von Hohenfeld zu Stiela ⚭ Anna von Drykopf
Otto I von Hohenfeld zu Attersee died 1320 ⚭ 1. Catharina Ecker [de] died ~1280 ⚭ 2. n.n. von Symaningen	Georg V died 1280	Afra	Rüdiger II died 1269 ⚭ Anna von Schönau died 1239	Johann II
Hohenfeld (main branch)

=== Middle Hohenfelds ===
The following genealogy starts with Otto von Hohenfeld and his second wife. Most genealogies start from this point, as the more reliable part of the family history begins here with him. Therefore, the counting of given names also starts over from this point onwards.

Otto I von Hohenfeld zu Attersee died 1320 ⚭ 1. Catharina Ecker [de] died ~1280 ⚭ 2. n.n. von Symaningen
Rüdiger I died 1349 ⚭ 1. Anna von Schweintall died ~1320 ⚭ 2. Margaretha von Aichberg died ~1330 (widow of Georg Jörger)	Ulrich I died 1335	Otto I
Otto II died >1355 ⚭ N.N.	Conrad von Treubach ⚭ Dorothea died 1335	Rüdiger I died 1349 ⚭ 1. Gertraud N.N. (widow of Conrad von Oedt)	Georg I
Rüdiger III ⚭ 1. Adelheit Jörger ⚭ 2. Anna von Schönau	Ulrich II

=== Legend ===
Duke
Landgrave / Margrave / Count Palatinate
Count

== Literature ==
=== Genealogies ===
- Conrad Kempf (1639), Hohenfeldische Genealogie
- Joh. Max Humbracht, Georg Helwig, G. Fr. von Greiffenclau zu Vollraths (1707), Die höchste Zierde Teutsch-Landes und Vortrefflichkeit des Teutschen Adels, ..., vol. 1, pp. 40–42.
- Johann Friedrich Gauhe (1719), Des heil. Röm. Reichs Genealogisch-historisches Adels-Lexicon, ..., pp. 676–680.
- Johann Georg Adam von Hoheneck (1727), Die löbliche Herren Herren Stände deß Ertz-Hertzogthumb Oesterreich ob der Ennß, vol. 1, pp. 380–423.
- Jakob Christoph Iselin (1740), Allgemeines historisches Lexikon, vol. 5, pp. 681–682
- Johann Hübner (1766), Genealogische Tabellen nebst denen darzu gehörigen Genealogischen Fragen Zur Erläuterung Der Politischen Historie ..., vol. 3, table 875-877.
- Franz K. Wißgrill, Karl von Odelga (1800), Schauplatz des landsässigen nieder-oesterreichischen Adels vom Herren- und Ritterstande..., vol. 4 (H–J), pp. 875–877.
- Constantin von Wurzbach (1863), Biographisches Lexikon des Kaiserthums Oesterreich, vol. 9, pp. 191–193, Kaiserlich-königliche Hof- und Staatsdruckerei, Wien.
- C. A. Starke, Limburg an der Lahn (1984), Genealogisches Handbuch des Adels (GHdA), Adelslexikon Band V, Band 84, ISSN 0435-2408, pp. 299–300.

=== Novel ===
- F. C. Schall (1857), Lucia von Hohenfeld, oder Verlobung und Tod, Historische Erzählung aus der Vorzeit des Landes Oesterreich ob der Enns, Joh. Haas, Wels
