= Eisenbach (disambiguation) =

Eisenbach may refer to:

- Eisenbach, a town in Baden-Württemberg, Germany
- Eisenbach (Breg), a river in Baden-Württemberg, Germany
- Eisenbach (Emsbach), a river in Hesse, Germany
