= Prandegg Castle =

Castle ruin in Upper Austria, Austria

Burgruine Prandegg
- Schönau im Mühlkreis, Austria
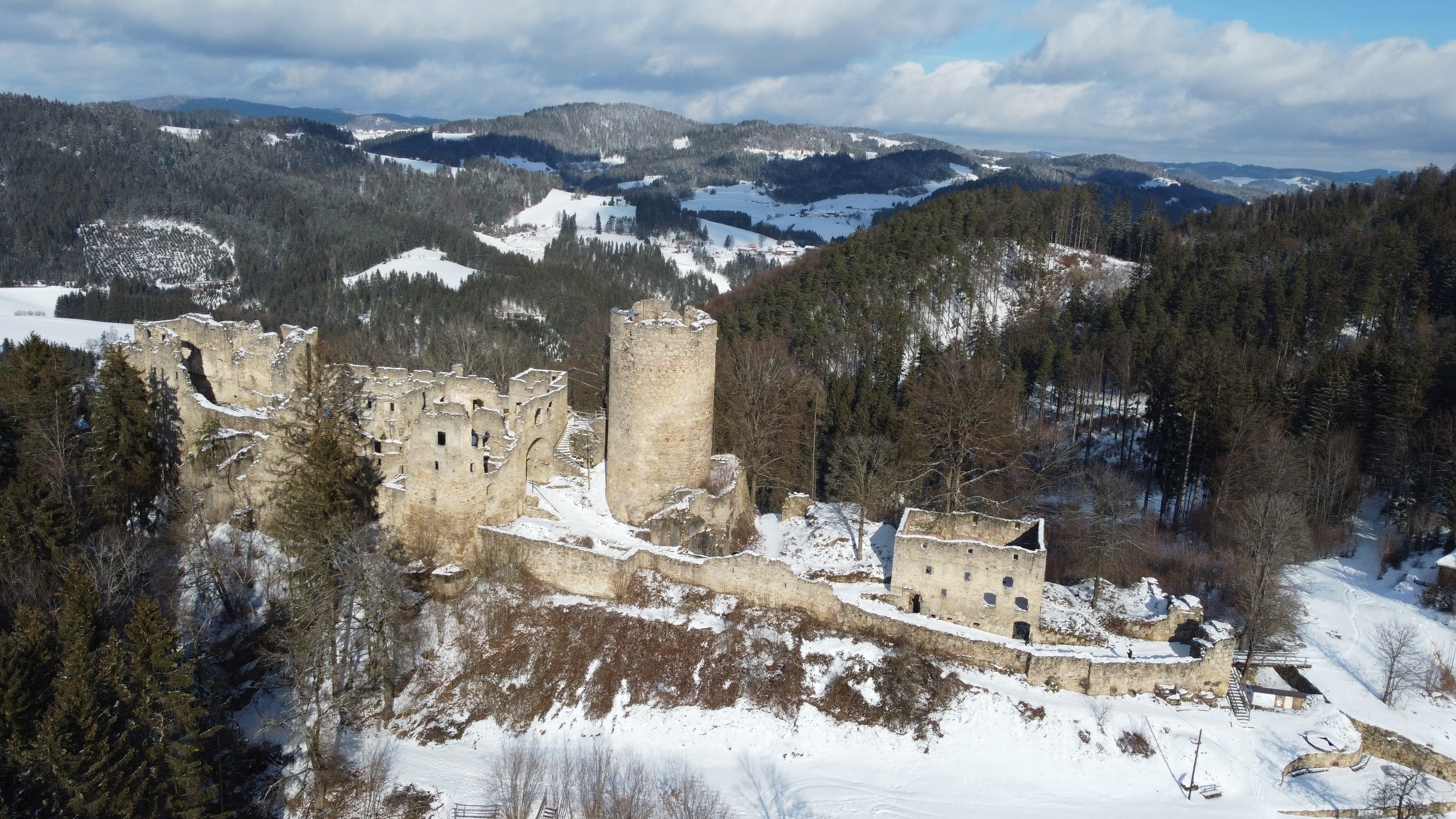
- view of the Prandegg Ruins

Site information
- Type: Castle
- Condition: Ruins

Location
- Coordinates: 48°24′53″N 14°40′00″E

Site history
- Built: 13th century

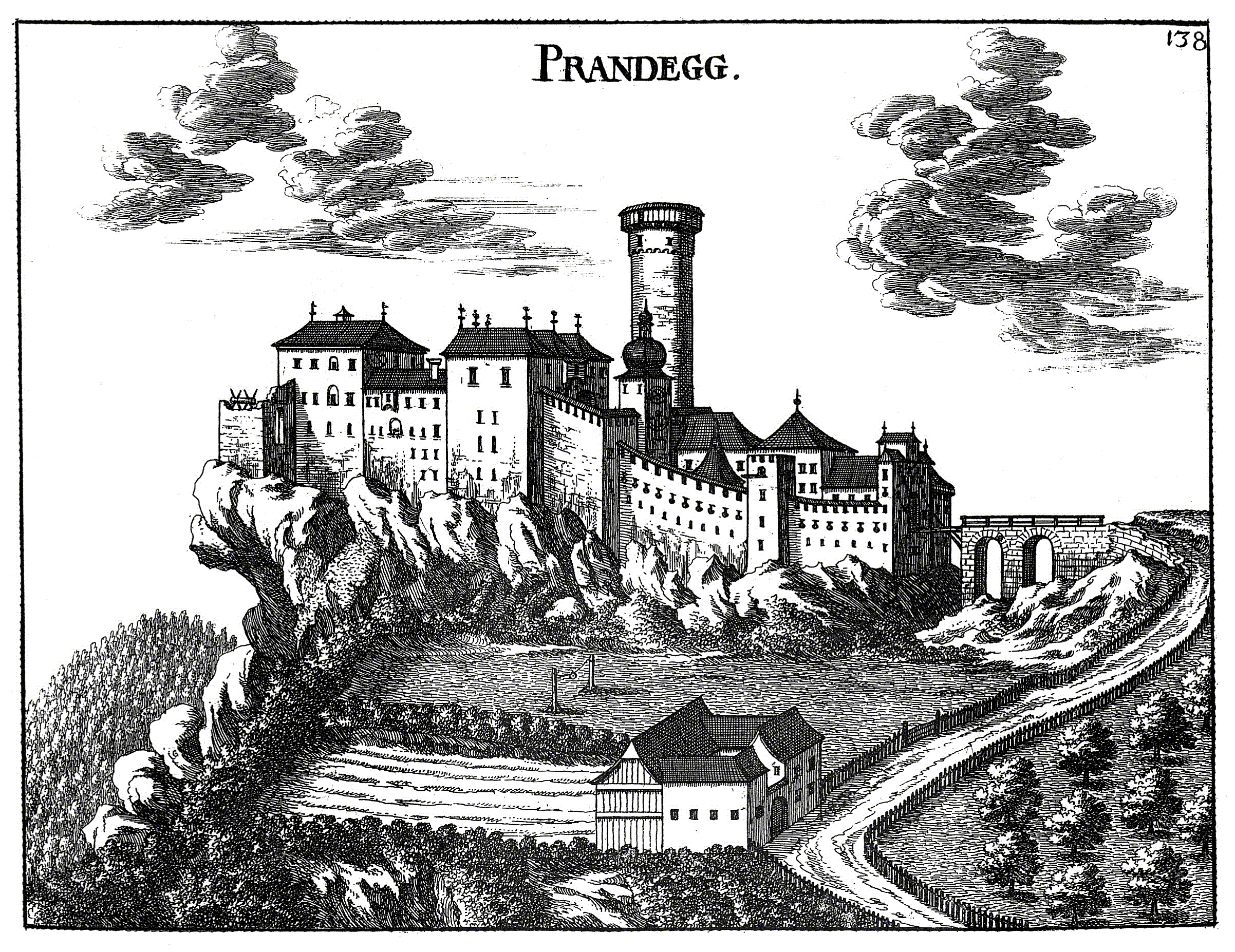
Prandegg Castle, engraving by Georg Matthäus Vischer (1674)

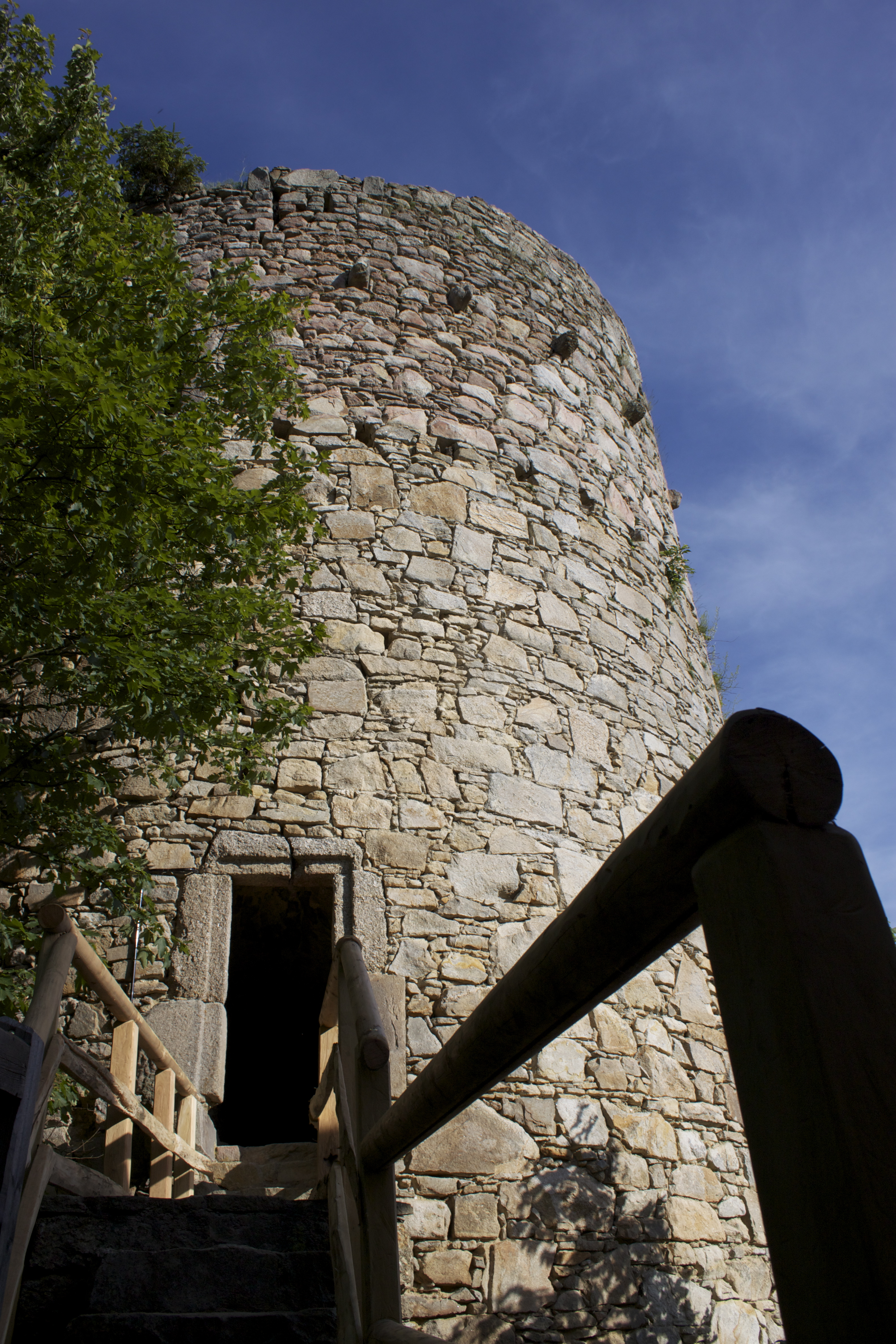
A tower of Prandegg Castle

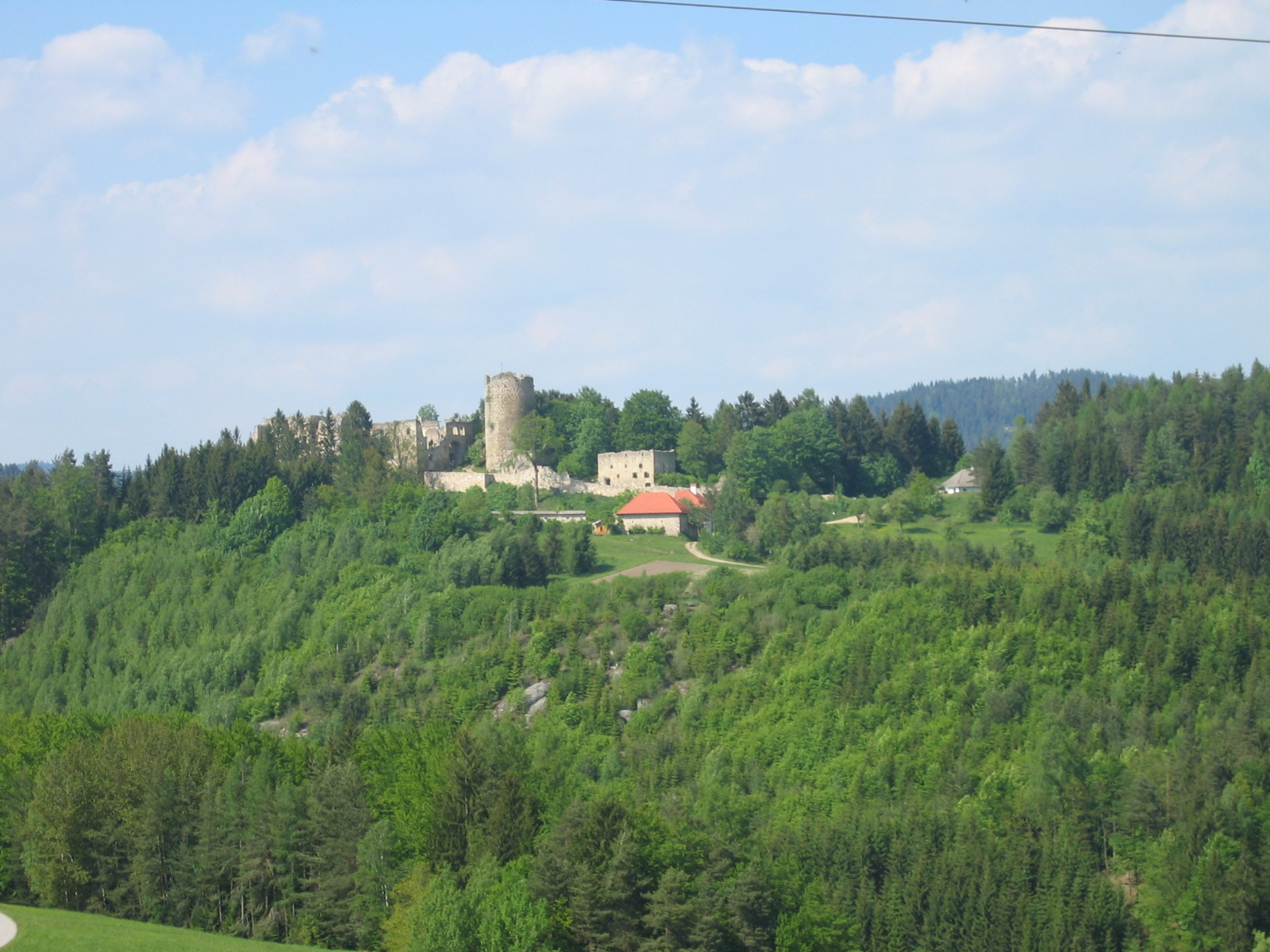
Prandegg Castle and its surrounding area

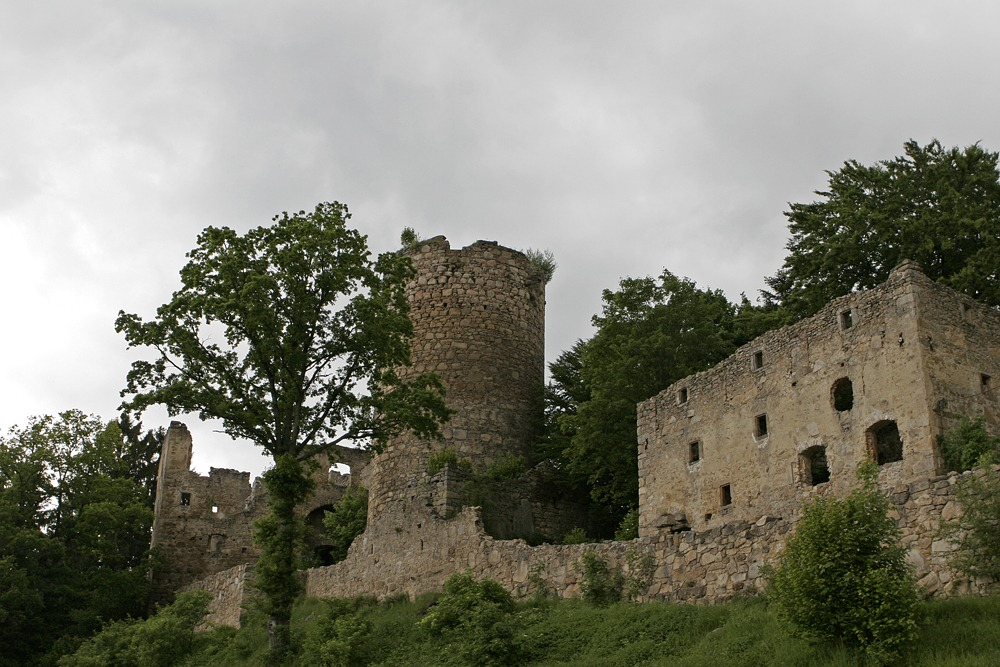
The ruins after renovation and cleaning

Prandegg Castle is a ruined hill castle in Austria, near the village of Schönau im Mühlkreis in the Freistadt District (which lies in the Mühlviertel area of Upper Austria).

== Location ==
Prandegg is an elongated castle on a hilltop adjacent to a collection of rocky cliffs. It lies at 705 metres (2,313 ft) above the Adriatic (the primary sea level determinate of Austria), between two valleys formed by the river Waldaist and the smaller stream Prandegg. Gutau is 3.9 kilometres (2.4 mi) as the crow flies, with Schönau im Mühlkreis lying 5.3 kilometres (3.3 mi) away. The nearest village is Pehersdorf, along Hiking Trail No. 82 (Wanderweg Nr. 82).

== Name ==
The Name Prandegg refers to the terrain on which the castle was constructed: this included an area of forest that was clear-cut using fire (in standard German Brand, which means "fire", rendered in the local dialect as prant) and a large, exposed rocky outcropping (from the standard German Ecke, for corner, rendered in the local dialect as egg).

== Description ==
Following the rocky outcropping upon which it is set, the castle is long and narrow. The total area of the grounds is 2,435 square metres (0.60 acres), of which the main castle occupies 1,490 square metres (0.37 acres). A previous structure, the late Romanesque old castle (Altburg), which was built at the end of the 12th century, was at the highest point of the northern ridge, and though it no longer exists, it once covered 340 square metres (3,700 ft^{2}). Nearby to the south, a castle chapel once stood, as well as a barrel-vaulted passage connecting it to the interior courtyard. A castle gate, a small gatehouse, and a palas were erected nearby as well, opposite a series of farm buildings. The residential buildings have been preserved up to a height of several stories, at least along the outer walls. In some cases, plaster layers, bay windows, window frames, window alcoves and pointed arch portals are still visible. The main castle is separated by a high wall from the bergfried, a powerful defensive tower typical of castles in German-speaking area. The bergfried of the Prandegg Castle is a 26-metre (85 ft) high, round tower built on a natural outcropping of rocks and with an elevated entrance. It is accessible today by a wooden bridge or simple wooden set of stairs and serves as a lookout point for the surrounding area. South of the bergfried lies the low-lying outer ward, which was separated from the inner ward by a 9-metre (30 ft) wide, man-made moat, over which a drawbridge allowed access to the heart of the castle. At the foot of the castle, the Maier courtyard once stood. Originally a four-sided space, some of the area has since been enclosed, and a restaurant now operates within this area.

== History ==
The first written mention of the castle occurred in 1287. Prandegg was for centuries intimately connected with the Zell Market (Markt Zell, today Bad Zell) and the nearby Zellhof Palace (Schloss Zellhof). Since the local boundaries changed in 1784, the castle now belongs to the community of Schönau im Mühlkreis. Prandegg lies in the northern part of this community, between the rivers Aist and Naarn, which in 853 CE was given by the Margrave William II to the Monastery of St. Emmeram in Regensburg.

An important point in the history of the fief, castle and lordship occurred when half of the holding was given to the bishopric of Regensburg and the other half was designated as a princely fief. At the beginning of the 13th century, the half belonging to Regensburg came into the possession of the Pranter family, and in 1298 this portion was shared with Haug von Reichenstein and Ulrich von Capellen. The princely fief (or Lehen) was held by Wernhard von Rußbach, but was acquired by Urlich von Capellen in 1300. Ultimately by 1352, the Reichensteiner portion was also held by the Capellen family, and remained undivided until the house's extinction in 1406. Afterwards, Prandegg was again divided when both daughters of the last Capellen male were married, and the holding was used as a dowry. Thus, the castle fell to the Dachsberger and Liechtenstein families. Later owners of the fief were the Polheimer family and Jörg Walch von Arbing, with the second half of the property being returned in 1492 to the Kaiser, who then gave it to Hilleprant Jörger in 1534. Two years later, his family acquired the other half of the fiefdom and also bought the castle. In 1536 Hilleprant Jörger bought Bad Zell, as well as its jurisdiction and Vogtei, from Regensburg. Jörger, however, was not satisfied with his holdings, and sought to increase them further. He acquired many other Hofs and tithings in the areas around Zell and Gutau. Hilleprant Jörger thus came into a considerable possession, which his heirs and descendants enlarged further. In 1596 they purchased the Habichrig, a nearby hilltop that was part of Bad Zell, together with the surrounding farms. In 1607 they also bought the Schloss Zellhof. The Jörger family lived mostly at Prandegg, but used the Schloss Zellhof as a second home, as well as a guest home. Both fiefdoms (Prandegg and Zellhof) were united under the Jörger family, resulting in a large area of influence for the noble family.

As Protestants, the Jörger family was forced in 1631 to sell their local possessions, including Prandegg Castle, Zellhof Castle, and numerous other tithes and farms, to Gotthard von Scherffenberg, Lord of Spielberg. When the lord died soon after, his widow remarried in 1636 to Hans Reichard von Starhemberk. However, the Scherffenberg family had begun to shift away from Prandegg in favour of Zellhof Castle, with the official residence eventually completely moving to the other castle. The "Prandegg Fiefdom" was gradually transformed into the "Zellhof Fiefdom", with only the district court of Prandegg retaining the original name (though it likewise moved to Zellhof). Hans Reichard von Starhemberk sold the entire property in 1642 to the Salzburg family, and afterwards the Prandegg Castle fell into disrepair. Only the brewery and the courtyard tavern were continued, though they too were likewise eventually abandoned. In 1784, the castle was removed from the municipality of Zell, as a result of shifting borders, and has since belonged to Schönau. Following the extinction of the Zellhof line of the House Salzburg in 1806, the estate passed to Graf Dietrichstein, who then sold Zellhof and Prandegg in 1823 to the dukes of the Saxe-Coburg and Gotha line of Greinburg Castle. Since then, the property has been in the possession of their descendants.

== Works cited ==
- Herbert E. Baumert; Georg Grüll (1988), Burgen und Schlösser in Oberösterreich : Mühlviertel und Linz (in German), vol. Band 1, Wien, pp. 134–136
- Bundesdenkmalamt Österreich, ed. (2003), Dehio : Oberösterreich Mühlviertel (in German), Horn/Wien: Verlag Berger, ISBN 978-3-85028-362-5
- Lambert Stelzmüller; Alois Schmid (1985), Heimatbuch der Marktgemeinde Bad Zell (in German), Linz
