= Reichenbächle =

Reichenbächle may refer to:

- Reichenbächle (Schiltach), a river of Baden-Württemberg, Germany, tributary of the Schiltach
- Reichenbächle (Breg), a river of Baden-Württemberg, Germany, tributary of the Breg
