= Dombach =

Dombach may refer to:

- Dombach (Emsbach), a river of Hesse, Germany, tributary of the Emsbach
- Dombach (Bad Camberg), one of the constituent communities of Bad Camberg, Germany
- Papiermühle Alte Dombach, a former paper mill in Bergisch Gladbach, Germany, now belonging to the LVR Industrial Museum
