= Wörsbach =

Wörsbach may refer to:

- Wörsbach (Emsbach), a river of Hesse, Germany, tributary of the Emsbach
- Wörsbach (Odenbach), a river of Rhineland-Palatinate, Germany, tributary of the Odenbach
