= Hainbach =

Hainbach may refer to the following:

== Music ==
- Hainbach (Musician), a composer of experimental electronic music and YouTube video creator based out of Berlin, Germany

== Settlements ==
- Hainbach (Aschau im Chiemgau), a village in the municipality of Aschau im Chiemgau in the county of Rosenheim, Bavaria, Germany
- Hainbach (Gemünden), a village in the municipality of Gemünden (Felda), Vogelsbergkreis, Hesse, Germany
- Hainbach (Hollfeld), a village in the borough of Hollfeld in the county of Bayreuth, Bavaria, Germany
- Hainbach (Gemeinde Klausen-Leopoldsdorf), a village near Klausen-Leopoldsdorf In the district of Baden, Lower Austria
- Hainbach (Gemeinde Aurach), Katastralgemeinde von Aurach am Hongar in the district of Vöcklabruck, Upper Austria
- Hainbach (Gemeinde Hartkirchen), a village in the municipality of Hartkirchen in the district of Eferding, Upper Austria
- Hainbach (Gemeinde Niederthalheim), a village in the municipality of Niederthalheim in the district of Vöcklabruck, Upper Austria
- Hainbach (Gemeinde Nußdorf), a village in the municipality of Nußdorf am Haunsberg in the district of Salzburg-Umgebung, Salzburg state, Austria

== Rivers and streams ==
- Hainbach (Eisenbach), a tributary of the Eisenbach (Emsbach) in Hesse, Germany
- Hainbach (Neckar), a tributary of the Neckar near Esslingen am Neckar, Baden-Württemberg, Germany
- Hainbach (Main), a tributary of the Main in Offenbach, Hesse, Germany
- Hainbach (Solmsbach), a tributary of the Solmsbach in the county of Lahn-Dill-Kreis, Hesse, Germany
- Hainbach (Speyerbach), a tributary of the Speyerbach in Rhineland-Palatinate, Germany
- Hainbach (Usa), a tributary of the Usa in Hesse, Germany
