= Urach (Breg) =

River in Germany

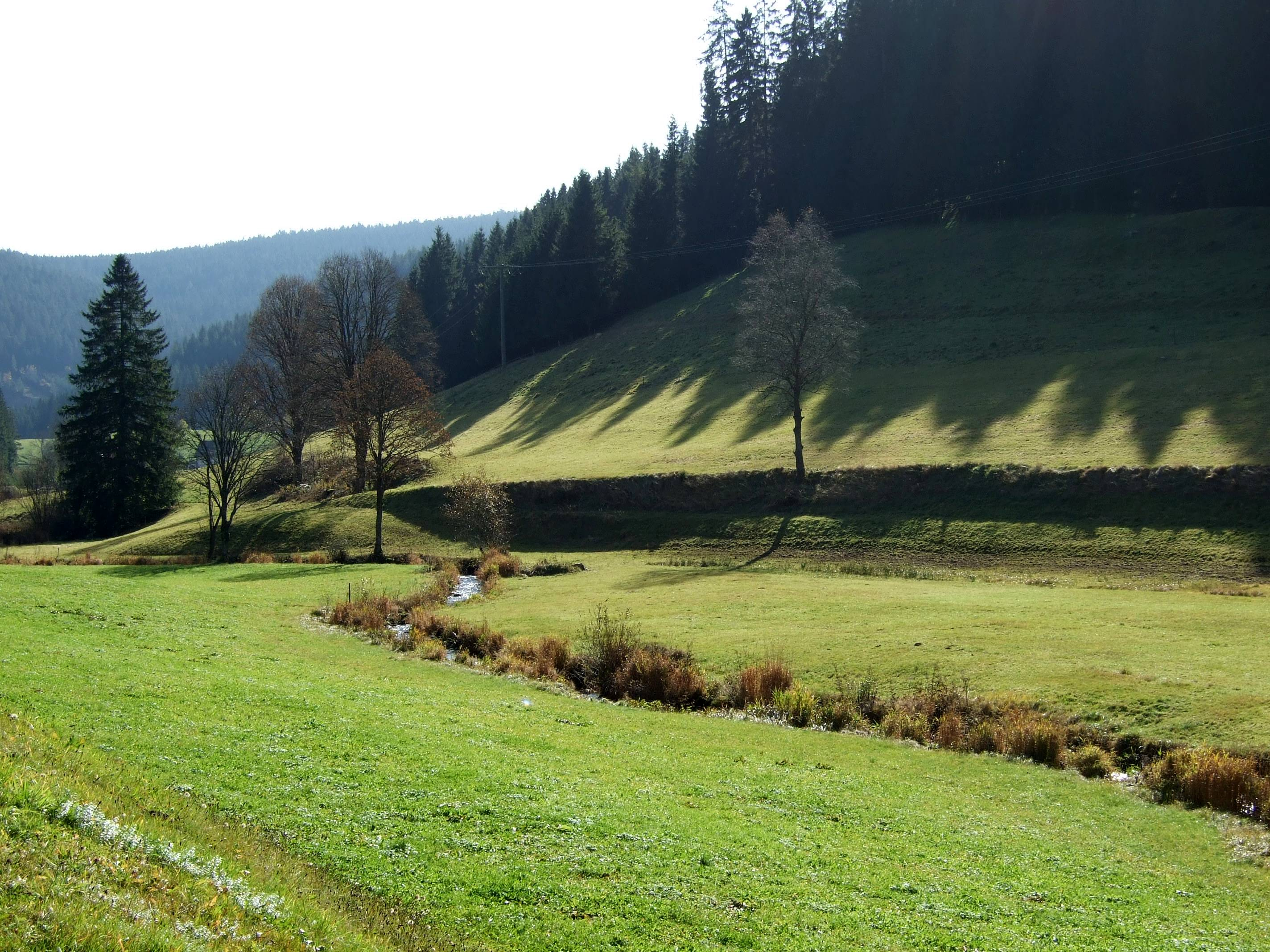

Location
- Country: Germany
- State: Baden-Württemberg

Physical characteristics
- Mouth
  - location: Hammerbach
  - coordinates: 47.9934°N 8.3123°E
- Length: 11.3 km (7.0 mi)

Basin features
- Progression: Hammerbach→ Breg→ Danube→ Black Sea

Urach is a river of Baden-Württemberg, Germany. It flows into the Hammerbach near Vöhrenbach.

== See also ==
- List of rivers of Baden-Württemberg
