= Schönau im Mühlkreis =

- Municipality
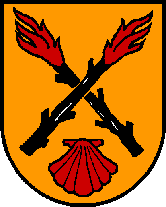
- Coat of arms

- Location within Austria
- Coordinates: 48°23′40″N 14°0′0″E
- Country: Austria
- State: Upper Austria
- District: Freistadt

Government
  - Mayor: Efrem Kriechbaumer (ÖVP)

Area
  - Total: 38.53 km^{2} (14.88 sq mi)
- Elevation: 635 m (2,083 ft)

Population (2018-01-01)
  - Total: 1,941
  - Density: 50.38/km^{2} (130.5/sq mi)
- Time zone: UTC+1 (CET)
  - Summer (DST): UTC+2 (CEST)
- Postal code: 4274
- Area code: 07261
- Vehicle registration: FR
- Website: www.schoenau-im.at

Schönau im Mühlkreis is a municipality in the district of Freistadt in Upper Austria, Austria. As of January 2013, the village has 1899 inhabitants.

== Geography ==
Schönau im Mühlkreis lies at 635 m above sea level in the Mühlviertel area of Upper Austria. The community runs 9.7 km from north to south, and 8.5 km from east to west, encompassing a total area of 38.6 km². Forests cover 17.4% of the community, while 19.7% of it is used for agriculture. Schönau is a relatively large community, area-wise, and is bordered in the north by the river Waldaist, and in the south by the lesser river Naarn.

=== Districts ===
- Fürling
- Hinterhütten
- Hofing
- Kaining
- Kollnedt
- Niederndorf
- Oberndorf
- Pehersdorf
- Prandegg
- Schönau im Mühlkreis
- Straß
- Unterniederndorf
- Wolfgrub

== History ==
Schönau was founded by the House von Perg und Machland, and is first found in written records from around 1230. The parish church, whose patron saint is James, son of Zebedee (James the Elder), is likewise first mentioned in historical records from 1230. During the Middle Ages, the town was a stopping point for pilgrims from Poland following the Way of St. James, on their way to Santiago de Compostela in Spain.

The Thirty Years' War and the Second Turkish Siege of Vienna both spared Schönau, which remained relatively untouched. In 1536 the Protestant Hilleprant Jörger bought the Prandegg Castle from Regensburg. The Jörger family made Schönau a base for the new religion, but with the Counter-Reformation of the mid-1500s, Schönau became a majority Catholic community once again. From 1660 to 1730, the town was the site of several witch trials. Until 1848 the community was part of other surrounding entities, including the domaines of Prandegg, Zellhof Castle, Schwertberg and Ruttenstein.

Following administrative changes in 1848, Schönau became its own self-governing community. Since 1918 the village has belonged to the nation of Austria. The village released its own emergency currency in 1920, to help lessen the economic hardship of the area, following the end of World War I.

The day after the Anschluss on March 12, 1938 (in which Germany annexed Austria into the German Reich), Schönau was incorporated into the Reichsgau Oberdonau (Gau Oberdonau). Following the end of World War II in 1945, the town lay in the Soviet Occupation zone. Until the end of 2002, the town belonged to the judicial district of Unterweißenbach, but beginning 1 January 2003, it now lies within the judicial district of Pregarten.

== Population ==
Population
Year	Inhabitants	Year	Inhabitants
1869	1,667	1951	1,589
1880	1,700	1961	1,629
1890	1,683	1971	1,708
1900	1,703	1981	1,736
1910	1,700	1991	1,823
1923	1,770	2001	1,818
1934	1,800	2008	1,885
1939	1,677

=== Development and structure ===
By 1869, 1667 people lived in the village. Until 1971 the population fluctuated roughly around this point, and did not change much. In 1991 the community contained 1823 residents, though according to the 2001 census, only 1818 people were located within the village, representing a 0.3% decrease. On 1 January 2008 the community contained 1885 residents, which was the highest number of residents in the history of the town. The population also experienced a positive change following the building of new construction. Through the continual improvement of the roads, Schönau has become more and more easily reached by Linz: it is now possible to reach the northern entrance of the city in half an hour.

As determined by the 2001 census, the proportion of residents who were 60 years or older was 18.3%. Of the residents, 20.6% were under the age of 15. The proportion of the population that is female was 49.8%.

Of the 1443 inhabitants of Schönau who were over 15 years old in 2001, 1.9% completed university, Fachhochschule, or study at an Academy. A further 5.4% had completed a Matura (the Austrian equivalent of the Abitur), while 46% had attended an Apprenticeship or berufsbildende mittlere Schule (a kind of vocational training program). Another 46.6% of all Schönau residents had completed only the minimum level required by the compulsory education laws of Austria.

=== Origin and language ===
The German dialect spoken in Schönau, as well as all over Austria, is the Central Bavarian dialect of the larger Bavarian language. As of 2001, 99.7% of Schönau residents listed the German language as the language they speak natively. A further 0.1% spoke mainly Czech, with a handful of others speaking yet other languages.

The percentage of Schönau residents coming from other countries (as of 2001) was 0.9%, far below the average for Upper Austria. Roughly 0.1% of Schönau residents come from Bosnia-Herzegovina, 0.4% are from Germany, with the rest coming from other nations. Overall, about 0.8% of Schönau residents, as of 2001, were born in other countries.

== Politics ==
The town council and mayoral elections take place every six years, at the same time as the Landtag elections. From 1945 until 1997, the Austrian People's Party (ÖVP) always maintained an absolute electoral majority. The second most popular party in town is the Social Democratic Party of Austria (SPÖ). The Freedom Party of Austria (FPÖ) is the third strongest party in Schönau, though they only ran for office in 1991 and 1997. In 2003 the ÖVP won 62.3% of the votes and ruled with an absolute majority. In 2009 the ÖVP raised this absolute majority to 71.3% of the electorate.

The town council election of 2009 had a voter turnout of 87.8% and resulted in the following:

Party / political faction	% of votes	Change (+/-)	Seats on town council	Change (+/-)
ÖVP	71.3%	+9.0%	14	+2
SPÖ	28.7%	-9.0%	5	-2

The mayor of the community is Herbert Haunschmied of the ÖVP. The town council has 19 members.

The next council election is scheduled to take place in 2015.

Schönau is a member of the Association for Regional and Tourism Development of Mühlviertler Alm.

== Coat of arms ==
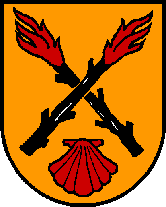
Schönau coat of arms

The community's coat of arms depicts two crossed, black burning branches above a red shell and on a gold field. The burning branches come from the coat of arms of the previously-prominent Pranter family, which built the nearby Prandegg Castle. The red shell is a reference to James, son of Zebedee (Jakobus der Ältere), who is the patron saint of the local church. The town's colors are red and yellow.

The adoption of the town's coat of arms and colors occurred 24 April 1972.

== Culture and landmarks ==
=== St James Parish Church ===
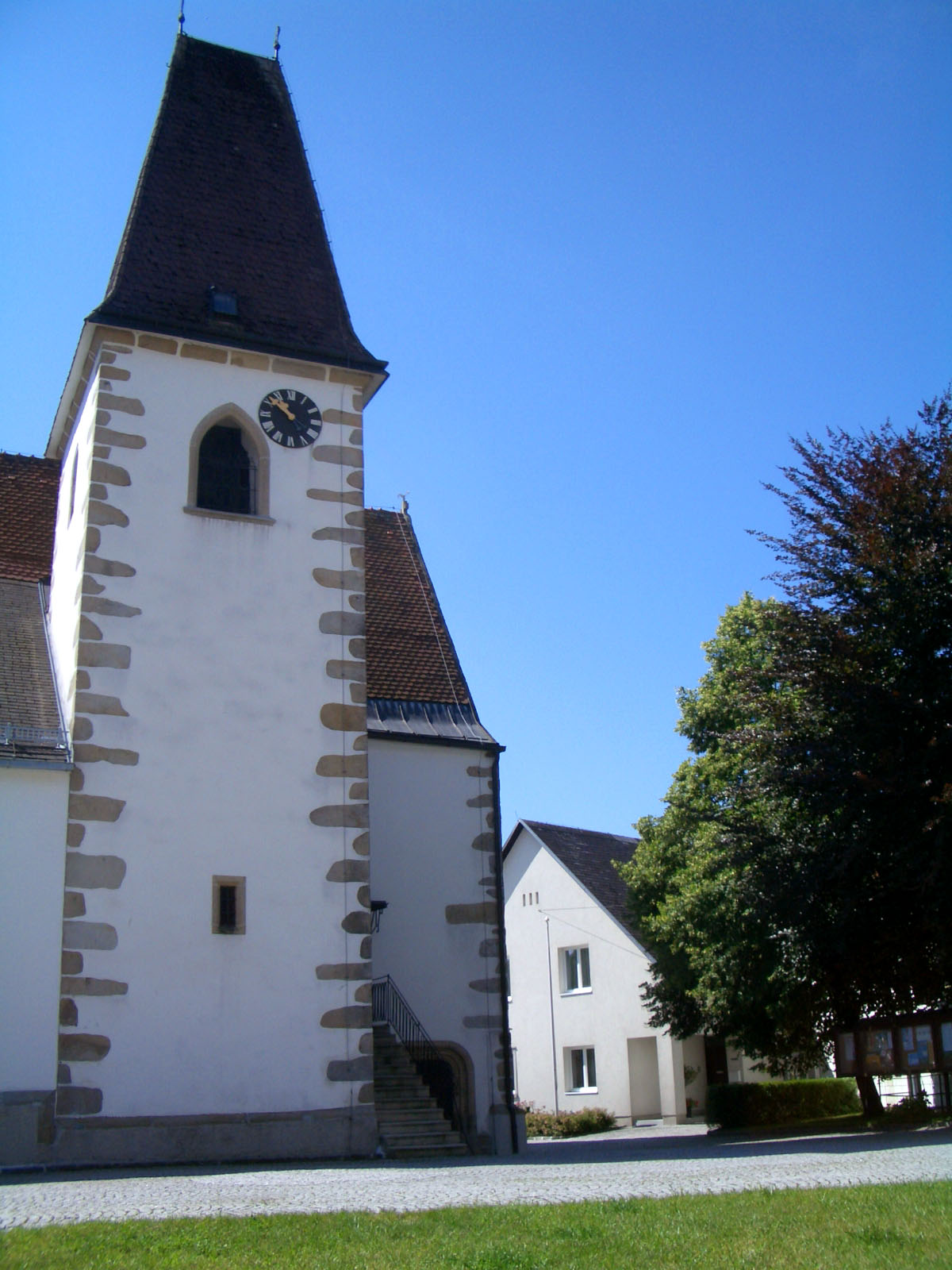
St James in Schönau

St James Parish Church was first mentioned in the written record in 1230, originally as a subsidiary church of the parish in nearby Naarn. Though the walls of the nave date to the Romanesque period, the low, squat bell tower was constructed sometime in the 13th or 14th century. In 1516 the nave was remodeled in the Gothic style. In 1968 the church was enlarged: the Gothic, Baroque choir area and the Gothic west gallery were removed, as was the Neo-Gothic furnishings. The modern additions are asymmetrically attached to the nave and include the Chancel, the baptistry, sacristy and the new organ loft. The furnishings are constructed from various materials. The organ (1993), with its two keyboards and 18 registers, comes from the Upper Austrian St. Florian Organ Company. In the church tower, there are four bells (G, B-flat, D, B).

=== Prandegg castle ===
The Prandegg Castle is a medieval, ruined hill castle that lies within the borders of Schönau. It is open to the public.

- Burgstall Rametstein, an archaeological site containing the remains of a wooden fort dating back to the 13th century and rediscovered in the 20th century, is also located within the town's borders.

=== Natural monuments ===
- Herrgottsitz: Shale stone that supposedly served as an early Christian site of worship and sacrifice.

=== Sport ===
Schönau contains the small ski area Stoaninger Alm, which contains a ski tow and two slopes. In the summer, Stoaninger Alm operates a Sommerrodelbahn, which is a type of dry toboggan run.

== Business and infrastructure ==
=== Traffic ===
Schönau im Mühlkreis is crossed from the northeast to the southwest by the Riedmark Landesstraße (L 576). The town is also crossed by a regional hiking and pilgrimage path (Johannesweg).

=== Public institutions and education ===
In Schönau there is a Kindergarten, a Volksschule and a library in operation. There is also a general practitioner working in the town.

Within the community, there are three volunteer fire departments: one in Schönau, one in Oberndorf and one in Prandegg.

== Works cited ==
- History Bibliography on History of Upper Austria
- Bundesdenkmalamt Österreich (Hrsg.): Dehio - Upper Austria Mühlviertel. Verlag Berger, Horn/Wien 2003, ISBN 978-3-85028-362-5.
