= Wörsbach (Emsbach) =

River in Germany

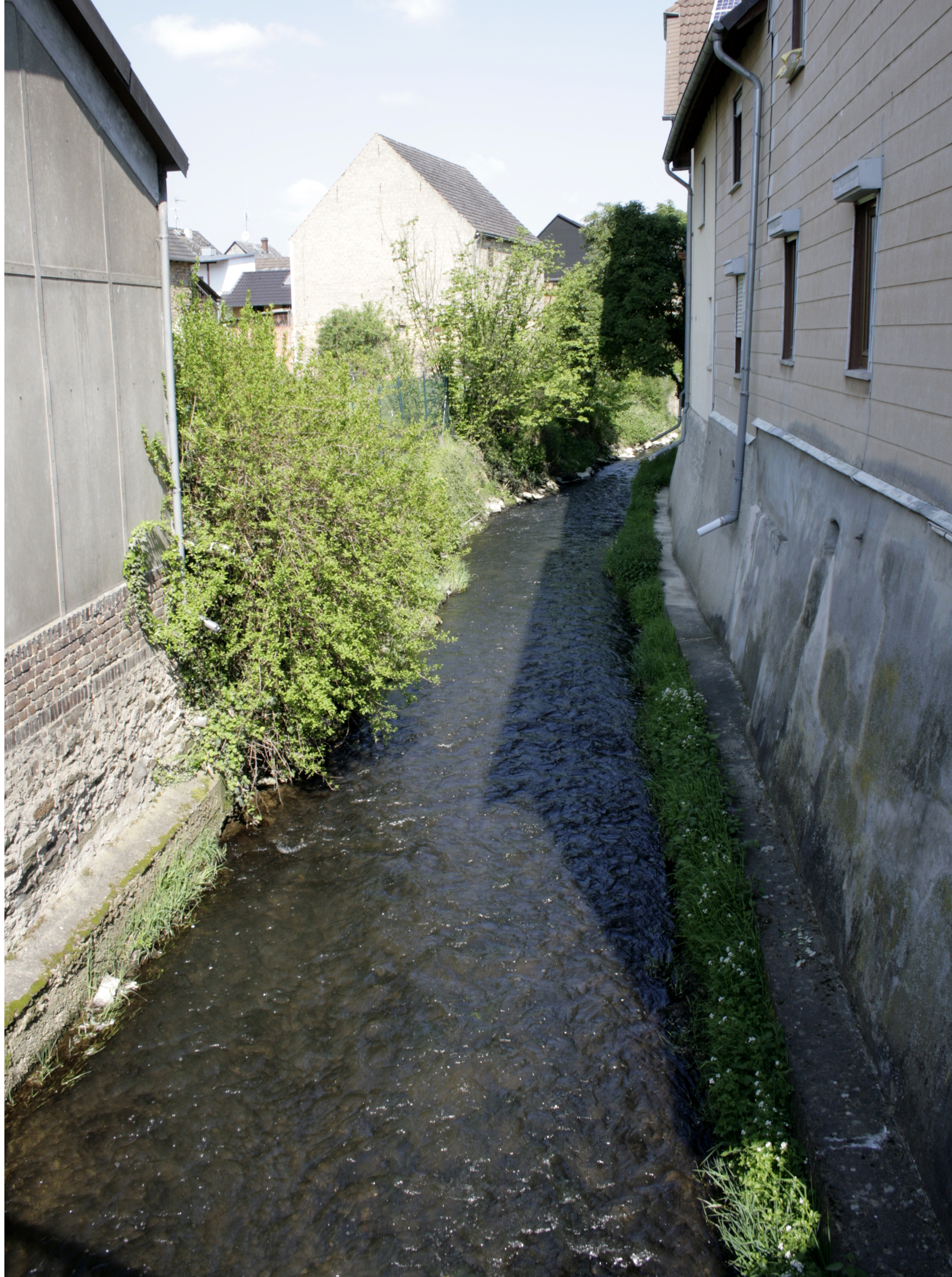

Location
- Country: Germany
- State: Hesse

Physical characteristics
- Mouth
  - location: Emsbach
  - coordinates: 50.3625°N 8.1520°E
- Length: 24.4 km (15.2 mi)

Basin features
- Progression: Emsbach→ Lahn→ Rhine→ North Sea

Wörsbach is a river of Hesse, Germany. It passes through Idstein, and flows into the Emsbach near Niederbrechen.

== See also ==
- List of rivers of Hesse
