= Reichenbächle (Breg) =

River in Baden-Württemberg, Germany

Location
- Country: Germany
- State: Baden-Württemberg

Physical characteristics
- Mouth
  - location: Breg
  - coordinates: 47.9716°N 8.4097°E

Basin features
- Progression: Breg→ Danube→ Black Sea

Reichenbächle is a river of Baden-Württemberg, Germany. It is a right tributary of the Breg near Wolterdingen.

== See also ==
- List of rivers of Baden-Württemberg
