= Dombach (Emsbach) =

River in Germany

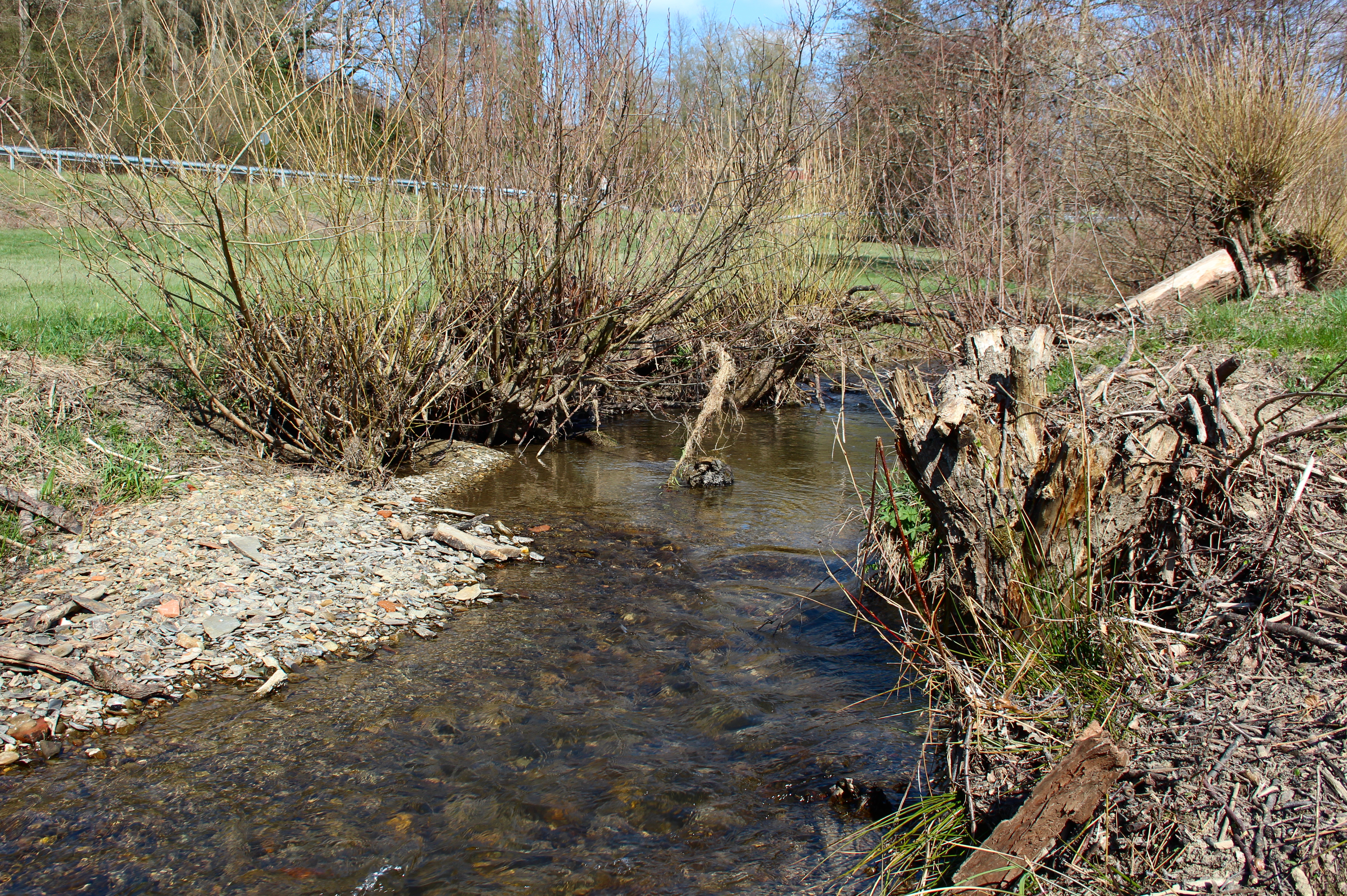

Location
- Country: Germany
- State: Hesse

Physical characteristics
- Mouth
  - location: Emsbach
  - coordinates: 50.3100°N 8.2517°E
- Length: 11.1 km (6.9 mi)

Basin features
- Progression: Emsbach→ Lahn→ Rhine→ North Sea

Dombach is a river of Hesse, Germany. It flows into the Emsbach near Bad Camberg.

== See also ==
- List of rivers of Hesse
