= Brändbach Dam =

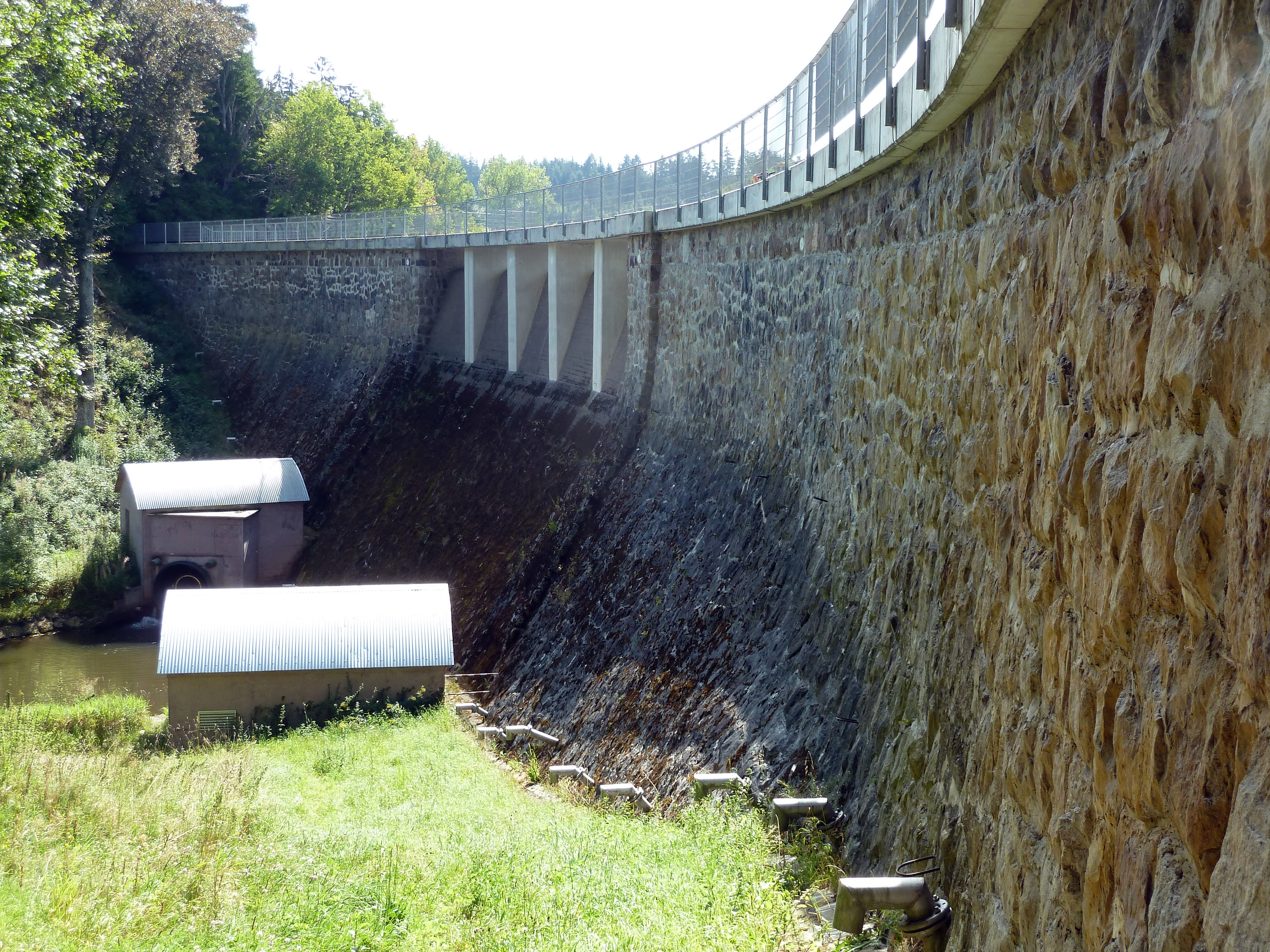
- Interactive map of Brändbach Dam
- Location: Schwarzwald-Baar-Kreis
- Coordinates: 47.9294°N 8.3720°E
- Construction began: 1921–1922

Dam and spillways
- Impounds: Brändbach
- Height (foundation): 15 m (49 ft)
- Length: 130 m (430 ft)
- Dam volume: 5,000 m^{3} (180,000 cu ft)

Reservoir
- Active capacity: 1.6 Mm^{3}
- Surface area: 0.35 km^{2} (0.14 sq mi)

The Brändbach Dam (German: Brändbachtalsperre), whose reservoir is called the Kirnbergsee, is a small dam near Bräunlingen in Baden-Württemberg in the Black Forest. It is used to generate electricity, for flood protection and for recreation. The lake lies within the Kirnbergsee protected area, which also includes surrounding areas. The dam impounds the Brändbach stream, which is part of the Breg catchment.

== Construction ==
The barrier is a crooked gravity dam made of concrete with rubble stone cladding. It was renovated in 2000 and was the first dam in Germany to be sealed with a plastic sealing sheet (geomembrane) of PVC on the reservoir side. In 1955 it had already been reinforced with concrete on the reservoir side.

== Power ==
The power capacity of the hydropower station is 300 kW; it generates 0.7 GWh per year. It is operated by the town of Bräunlingen.

== Reservoir ==
Since 2008, the Kirnbergsee has been assessed as of "excellent quality" according to EU bathing water standards.

== See also ==
- List of dams in Germany

== Literature ==
- Dietmar Veyhle und Jürgen Köngeter: Die Brändbachtalsperre – Erstmalige Sanierung einer Staumauer mit einer Geomembran in Deutschland, Wasserwirtschaft 4/2003
