= Breg (river) =

Baden-Württemberg, Germany

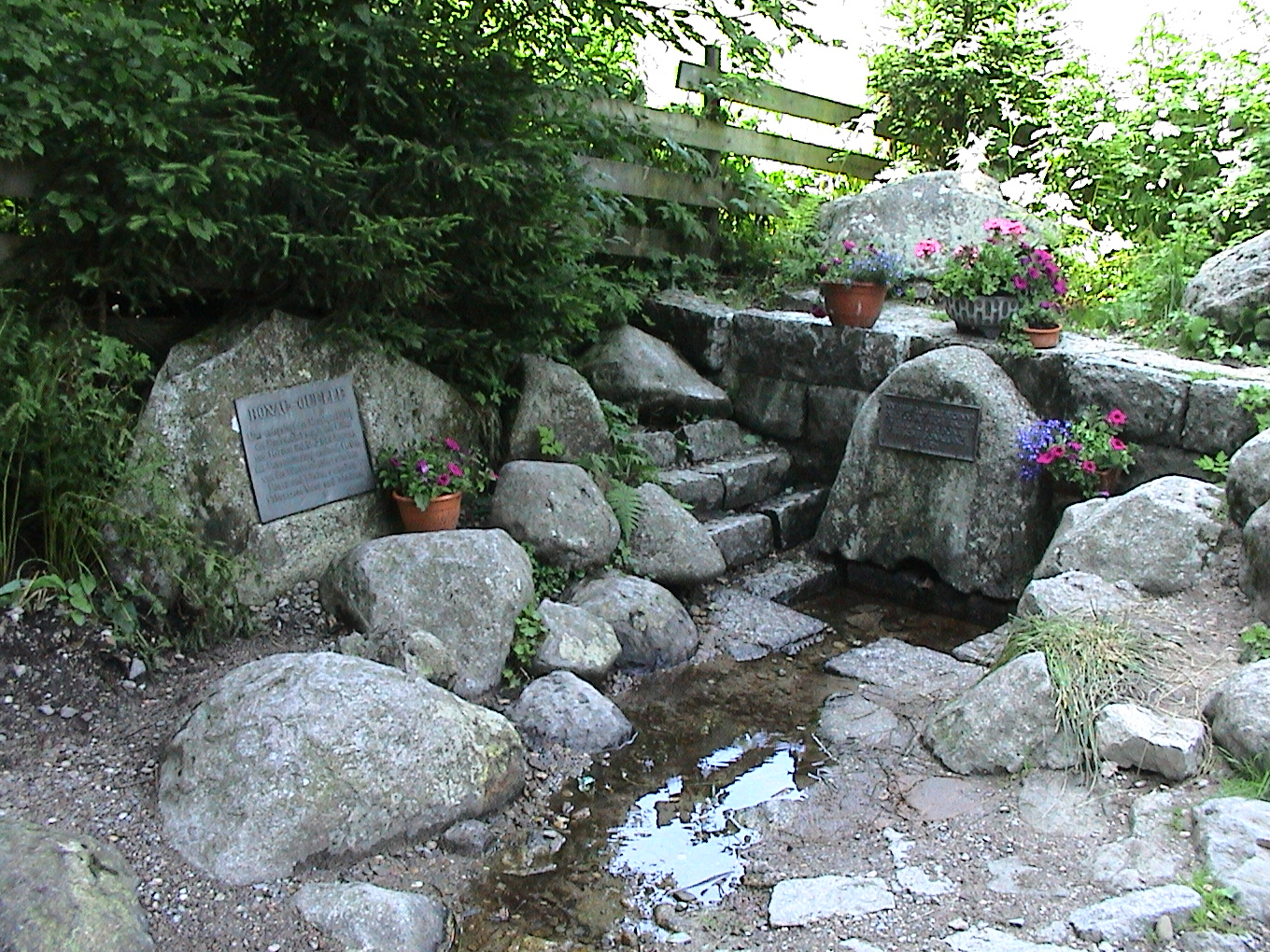
- The source of the Breg is the geographical source of the Danube and is a protected monument
- The river and its source

Location
- Country: Germany
- State: Baden-Württemberg
- District: Schwarzwald-Baar-Kreis
- Reference no.: DE: 1111

Physical characteristics
- Source
  - location: St. Martin's Chapel, 6 km northwest of Furtwangen
  - coordinates: 48°05′43″N 8°09′18″E
  - elevation: 1,078 m above sea level (NN)
- Mouth
  - location: Confluence: with the Brigach to form the Danube east of Donaueschingen
  - coordinates: 47°57′04″N 8°31′14″E
  - elevation: ca. 672 m above sea level (NN)
- Length: 46.153 km
- Basin size: 291.488 km^{2}
- Discharge
  - location: at Donaueschingen gauge
  - average: 5.95 m^{3}/s

Basin features
- Progression: Danube→ Black Sea
- Landmarks: Small towns: Furtwangen, Vöhrenbach, Bräunlingen, Hüfingen, Donaueschingen

The Breg is a river, 46 kilometres long, in Baden-Württemberg, Germany, and the primary headstream of the Danube.

== Description ==
The Breg is the longest and biggest headstream of the river Danube. It flows through the southeast part of the Middle Black Forest and the lowlands of the Baar region.

The Breg rises at a height of 1,078 m above sea level (NN), six kilometres northwest of Furtwangen. Its source, which is near St. Martin's Chapel and is also called the source of the Danube or Donauquelle, is protected as a natural monument. It is located about 100 metres south-east of the Rhine / Danube watershed (the great European Watershed). Beyond that, about 900 metres away is the source of the Elz, which flows in the same longitudinal valley but initially in the opposite direction, to the north, and later flows into the Rhine.

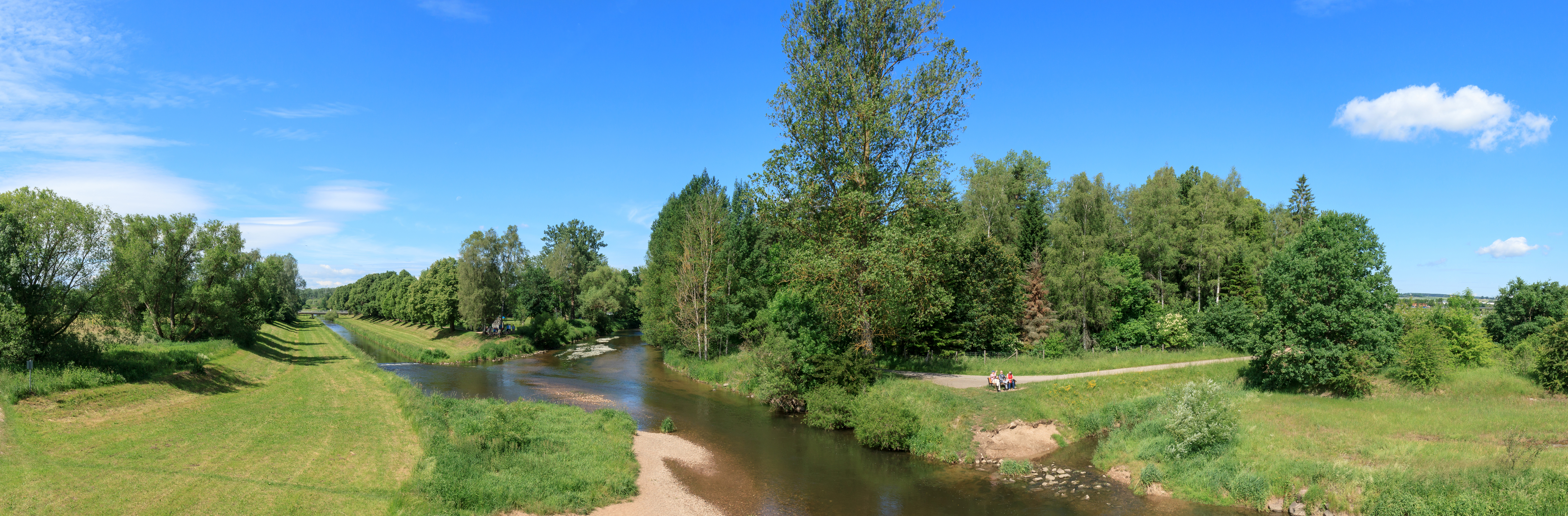
Confluence with the Brigach (rear right) to form the River Danube (foreground right)

In its upper section, known as the Katzensteig, the Breg valley is a result of glaciation, with a low gradient and landscape characterized by large Black Forest houses. Between the towns of Furtwangen and Vöhrenbach, the Breg flows eastwards through a broader and somewhat more densely populated valley, then in a generally southeasterly direction through a solitary forest valley, accompanied by a road and the route of the former Breg Valley Railway, which is now a bicycle track. Shortly before Hammereisenbach-Bregenbach, the Breg is joined by the Linach just below the Linach Reservoir and, in the village, by the Hammerbach, a short tributary, but the most important thanks to its two large headstreams. Near Bräunlingen, the Breg meets the Röthenbach stream at the Kirnbergsee. Here the Breg leaves the Black Forest and continues via Hüfingen to Donaueschingen, through wide, open countryside on the plateau of the Baar.

After 46.2 kilometres, the Breg merges with the Brigach in Donaueschingen to form the Danube. Since the Breg is both the longest and most voluminous river of the Danube, with a catchment area of 291.5 km^{2}, its source is considered hydrographically as the source of the Danube.

== Tributaries ==
This list only shows the more important tributaries. For the full list see de: Liste der Zuflüsse der Breg

- Schützenbach (left)
- Hintere Breg (right)
- Rohrbach (left)
- Langenbach (left)
- Linach (right)
- Hammerbach (right) with the upper reaches of the Eisenbach and Urach
- Forbach (left)
- Kohldobelbächle (left)
- Reichenbächle (right)
- Weiherbach (left)
- Landgraben (right)
- Röthenbach (right)

== See also ==
- List of rivers of Baden-Württemberg
