= Hintere Breg =

River in Germany

Location
- Country: Germany
- States: Baden-Württemberg

Physical characteristics
- Mouth
  - location: Breg
  - coordinates: 48.0496°N 8.2097°E

Basin features
- Progression: Breg→ Danube→ Black Sea

Hintere Breg is a river of Baden-Württemberg, Germany. It flows into the Breg in Furtwangen im Schwarzwald.

== See also ==
- List of rivers of Baden-Württemberg
