= Gutau =

- Municipality
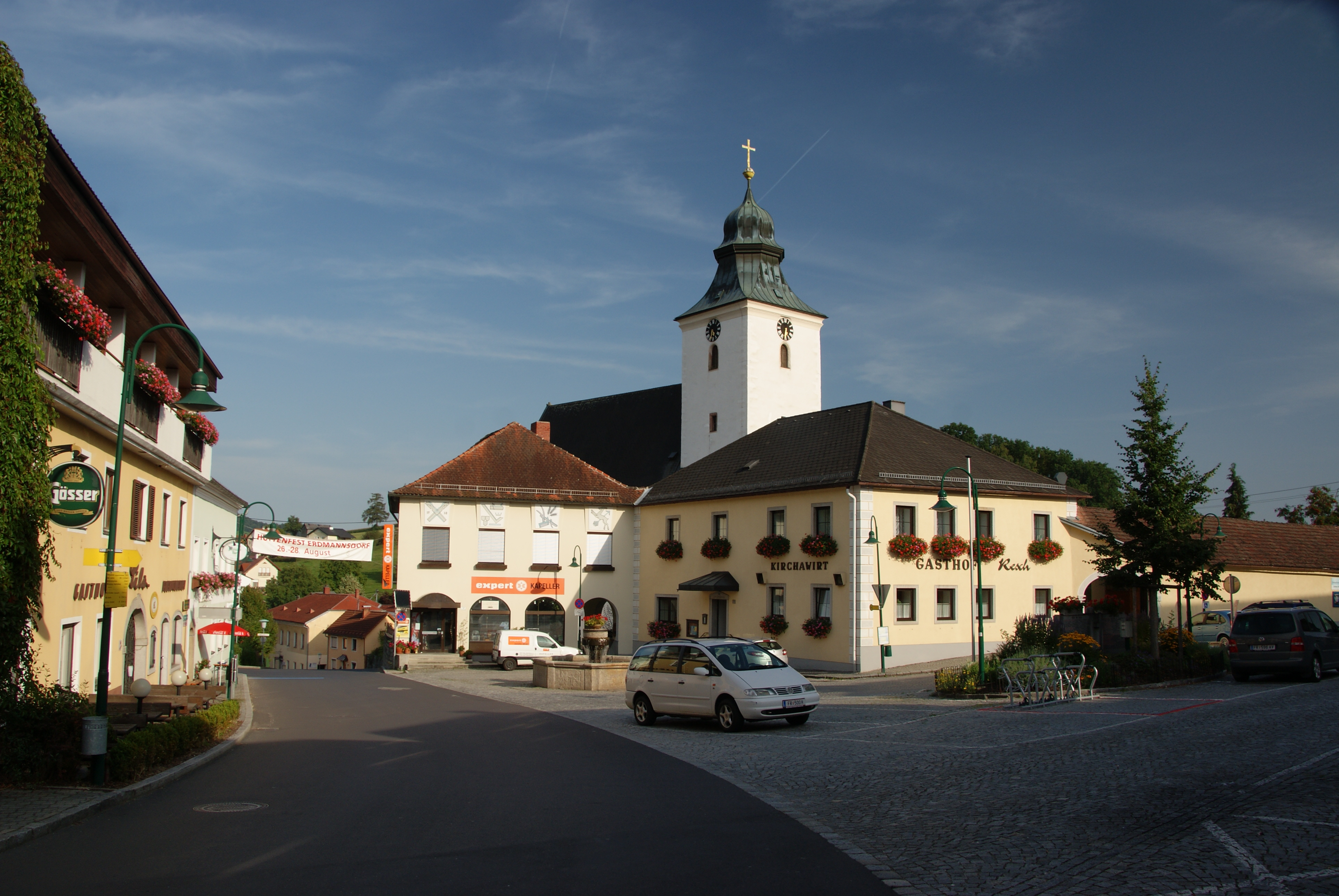
- Gutau centre

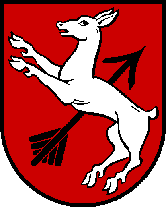
- Coat of arms

- Location within Austria
- Coordinates: 48°25′0″N 14°36′0″E
- Country: Austria
- State: Upper Austria
- District: Freistadt

Government
  - Mayor: Josef Lindner (SPÖ)

Area
  - Total: 45.44 km^{2} (17.54 sq mi)
- Elevation: 589 m (1,932 ft)

Population (2018-01-01)
  - Total: 2,724
  - Density: 59.95/km^{2} (155.3/sq mi)
- Time zone: UTC+1 (CET)
  - Summer (DST): UTC+2 (CEST)
- Postal code: 4293
- Area code: 07946
- Vehicle registration: FR
- Website: www.gutau.at

Gutau is a municipality in the district of Freistadt in the Austrian state of Upper Austria.

== Population ==
Historical population
| Year | Pop. | ±% |
|---|---|---|
| 1869 | 2,112 | — |
| 1880 | 2,164 | +2.5% |
| 1890 | 2,052 | −5.2% |
| 1900 | 2,123 | +3.5% |
| 1900 | 2,123 | +0.0% |
| 1910 | 2,131 | +0.4% |
| 1923 | 2,151 | +0.9% |
| 1934 | 2,141 | −0.5% |
| 1939 | 2,027 | −5.3% |
| 1951 | 2,137 | +5.4% |
| 1961 | 2,292 | +7.3% |
| 1971 | 2,360 | +3.0% |
| 1981 | 2,379 | +0.8% |
| 1991 | 2,548 | +7.1% |
| 2001 | 2,650 | +4.0% |
| 2013 | 2,721 | +2.7% |

== Language ==
In 2001, 98.1% of the population should German as a first language, 0.5% spoke Bosnian, and 0.1% spoke Turkish.

== Sport ==
Gutau hosted stages of the Jänner Rallye, which was the season opener for the European Rally Championship in 2012.
