= Wolterdingen =

Village in Baden-Württemberg, Germany

Coordinates: 47.972°N 8.422°E

Wolterdingen is a village near Donaueschingen in the southern Black Forest of the Baden-Württemberg federal state in Germany.
