= Eisenbach (Breg) =

Location
- Country: Germany
- State: Baden-Württemberg

Physical characteristics
- Mouth
  - location: Breg
  - coordinates: 47.9971°N 8.3294°E
- Length: 11.2 km (7.0 mi)

Basin features
- Progression: Breg→ Danube→ Black Sea

Eisenbach (in its lower course: Hammerbach) is a river of Baden-Württemberg, Germany. It flows into the Breg near Vöhrenbach.

== See also ==
- List of rivers of Baden-Württemberg
