= Eisenbach (Emsbach) =

German river

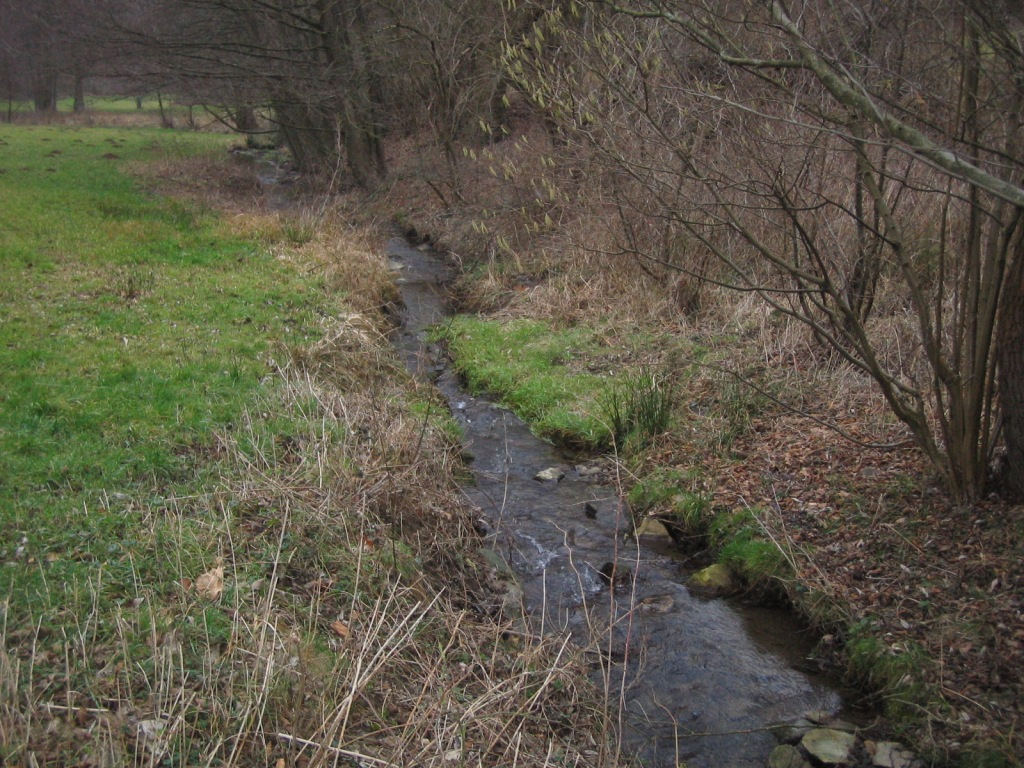

Location
- Country: Germany
- State: Hesse

Physical characteristics
- Mouth
  - location: Emsbach
  - coordinates: 50.3314°N 8.2403°E

Basin features
- Progression: Emsbach→ Lahn→ Rhine→ North Sea

Eisenbach is a river of Hesse, Germany. Its source is near the village of Haintchen. It flows into the Emsbach near Niederselters.

== See also ==
- List of rivers of Hesse
