= Jörger von Tollet =

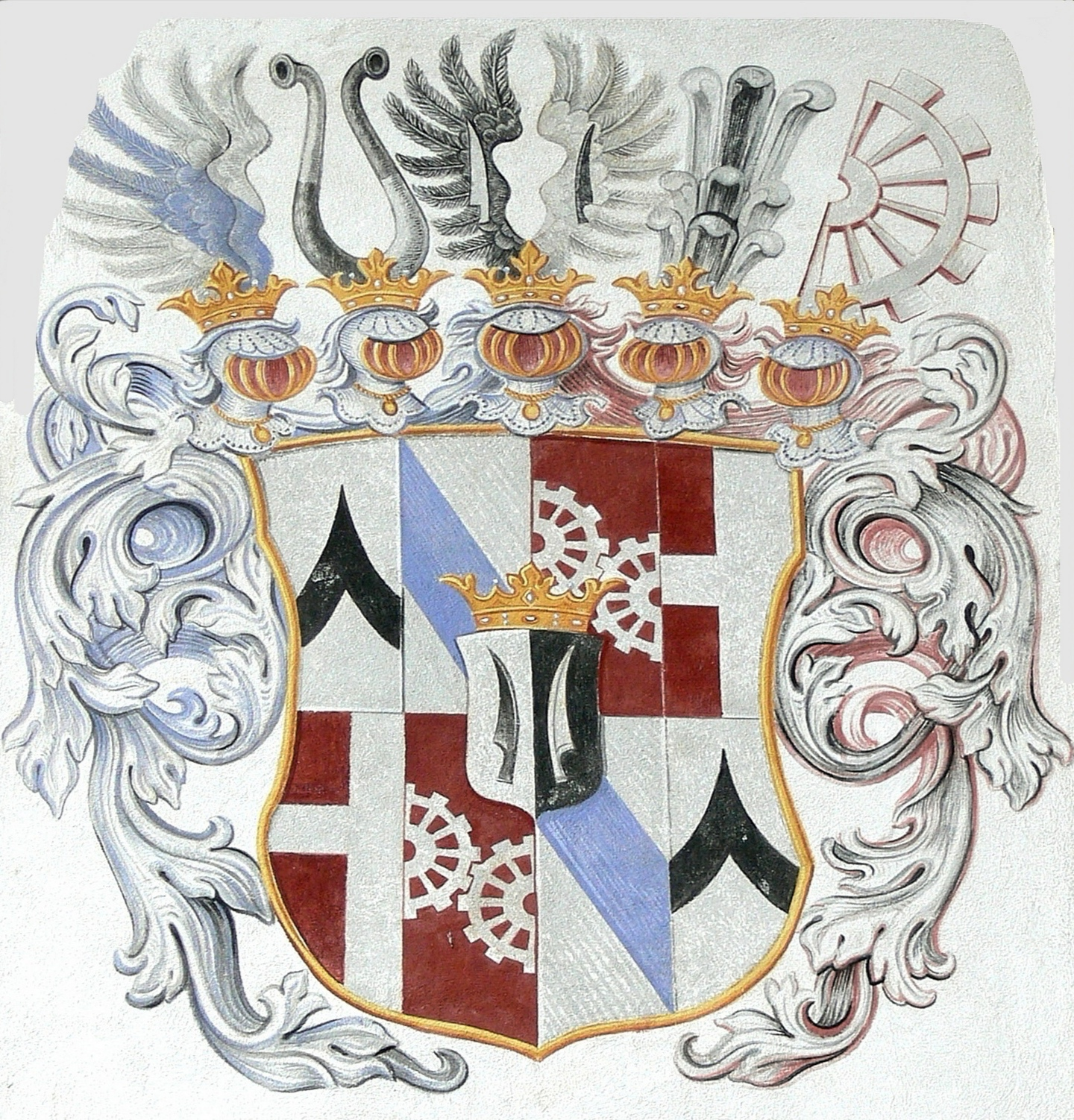
Coat of arms Jörger as counts and imperial counts

The Jörger von Tollet (also: Jörger, Jörger zu Tollet) family is an old and influential Austrian noble family.

== History ==
The first appeared in the 13th century in Upper Austria. Members of the family held the title of Imperial Count.

== Literature ==
- Constantin von Wurzbach: "Jörger zu Tollet, das Grafengeschlecht, Genealogie." In: Biographisches Lexikon des Kaiserthums Oesterreich (Biographical Lexicon of the Empire of Austria). Part 10 Kaiserlich-königliche Hof- und Staatsdruckerei, Vienna 1863, p. 228–230 (digitalised).
- Constantin von Wurzbach: "Jörger zu Tollet, das Grafengeschlecht, Wappen." In: Biographisches Lexikon des Kaiserthums Oesterreich (Biographical Lexicon of the Empire of Austria). Part 10 Kaiserlich-königliche Hof- und Staatsdruckerei, Vienna 1863, p. 232 f. (digitalised).
- Heinrich Wurm: Die Jörger von Tollet. Linz 1955.
- Georg Heilingsetzer (1974). "Jörger von Tollet". Neue Deutsche Biographie (in German). Vol. 10. Berlin: Duncker & Humblot. p. 463. (full text online).
- Irene und Christian Keller: Die Jörger von Tollet und ihre Zeit. Begleitkatalog zur Sonderausstellung "Standpunkte" im Schloss Tollet. Ried 2010.
- Norbert Loidol: Renaissance in Oberösterreich. Weitra 2010
- Karl Vocelka, Rudolf Leeb, Andrea Scheichl (Hrsg.): Renaissance und Reformation. Katalog zur OÖ. Landesausstellung 2010.
