= Emsbach =

River in Germany

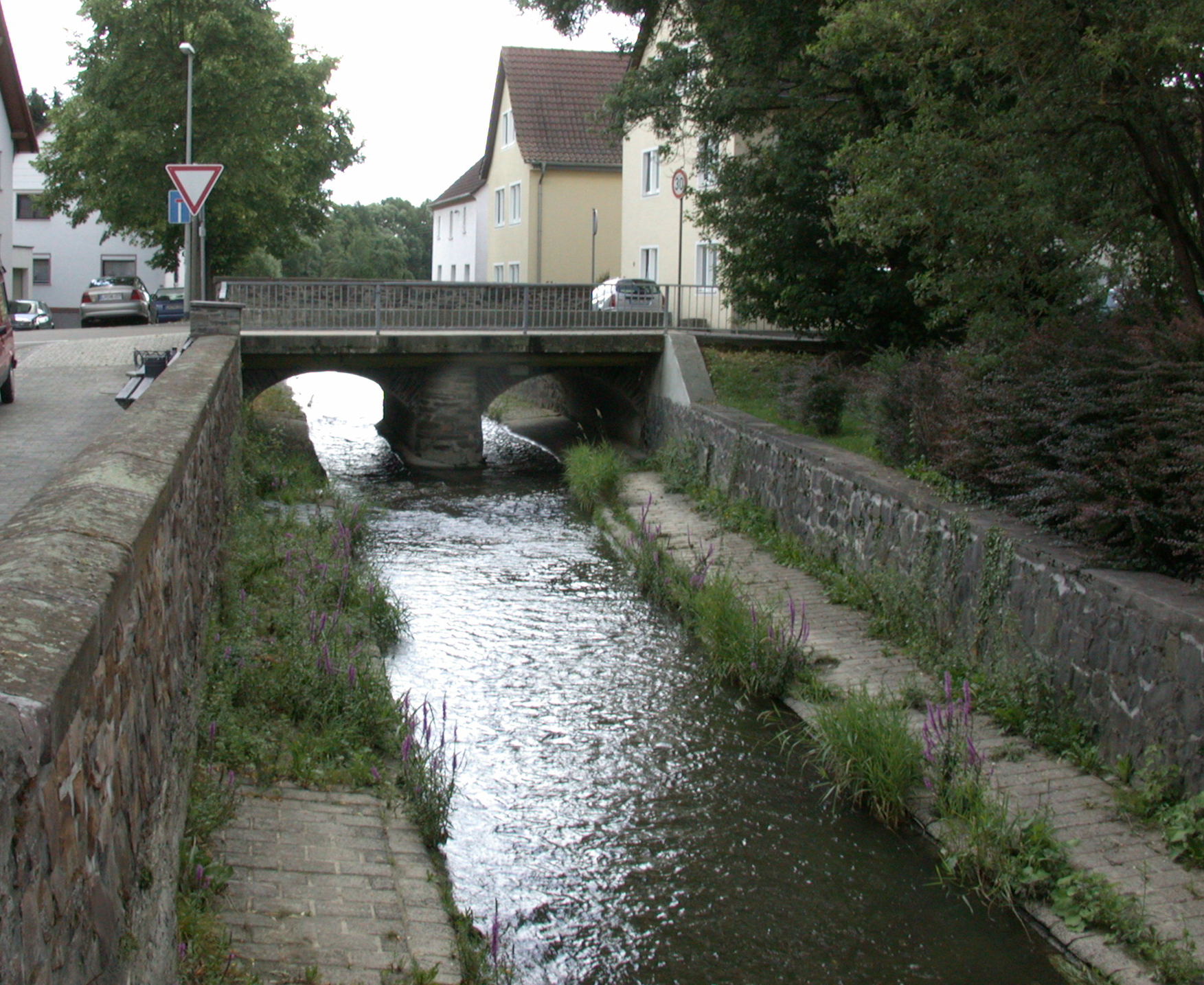

Location
- Country: Germany
- State: Hesse

Physical characteristics
- Mouth
  - location: Lahn
  - coordinates: 50.3986°N 8.0980°E
- Length: 39.0 km (24.2 mi)
- Basin size: 322 km^{2} (124 sq mi)

Basin features
- Progression: Lahn→ Rhine→ North Sea

Emsbach is a river of Hesse, Germany. It flows into the Lahn in Eschhofen.

== See also ==
- List of rivers of Hesse
