= Silberberg (Todtnau) =

Mountain in Germany

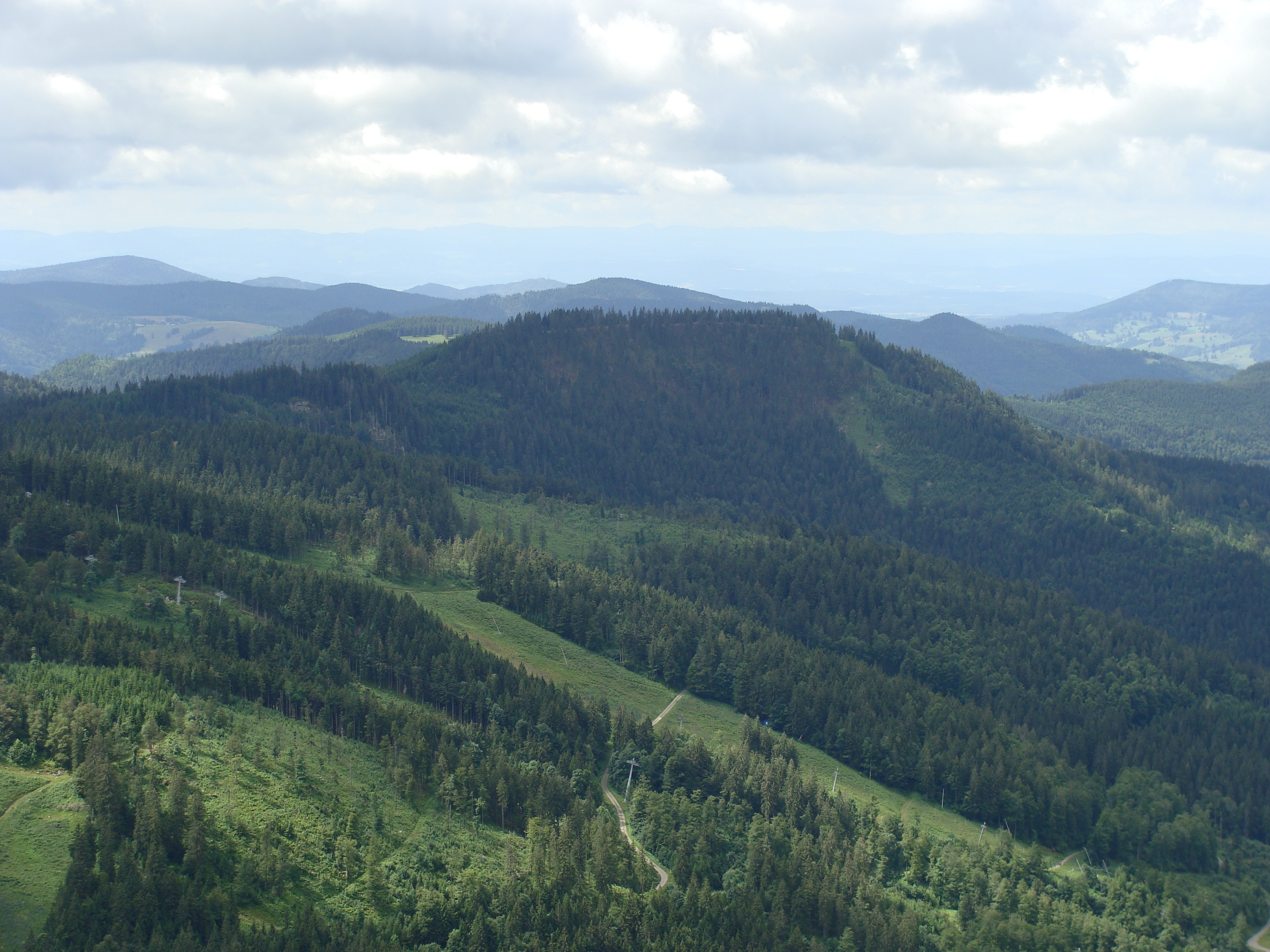

Highest point
- Elevation: 1,358 m above sea level (NHN) (4,455 ft)
- Prominence: 90 m ↓ Wolfsgrüble
- Isolation: 1.2 km → Herzogenhorn
- Coordinates: 47°50′16″N 7°59′47″E

Geography
- Location within Baden-Württemberg
- Location: Baden-Württemberg, Germany
- Parent range: Black Forest

Geology
- Rock type(s): gneiss, amphibolite

The Silberberg (German pronunciation: [ˈzɪlbɐˌbɛʁk], "silver mountain"), at 1,358.2 m above sea level (NHN), (along with the Spießhorn, 1,348.9 m above NHN,) is the most prominent summit in the mountain group around the Herzogenhorn (1,415.2 m above NHN) in the Black Forest in the southwest German state of Baden-Württemberg. It lies about 4 kilometres east of the town of Todtnau.

== Location and topography ==
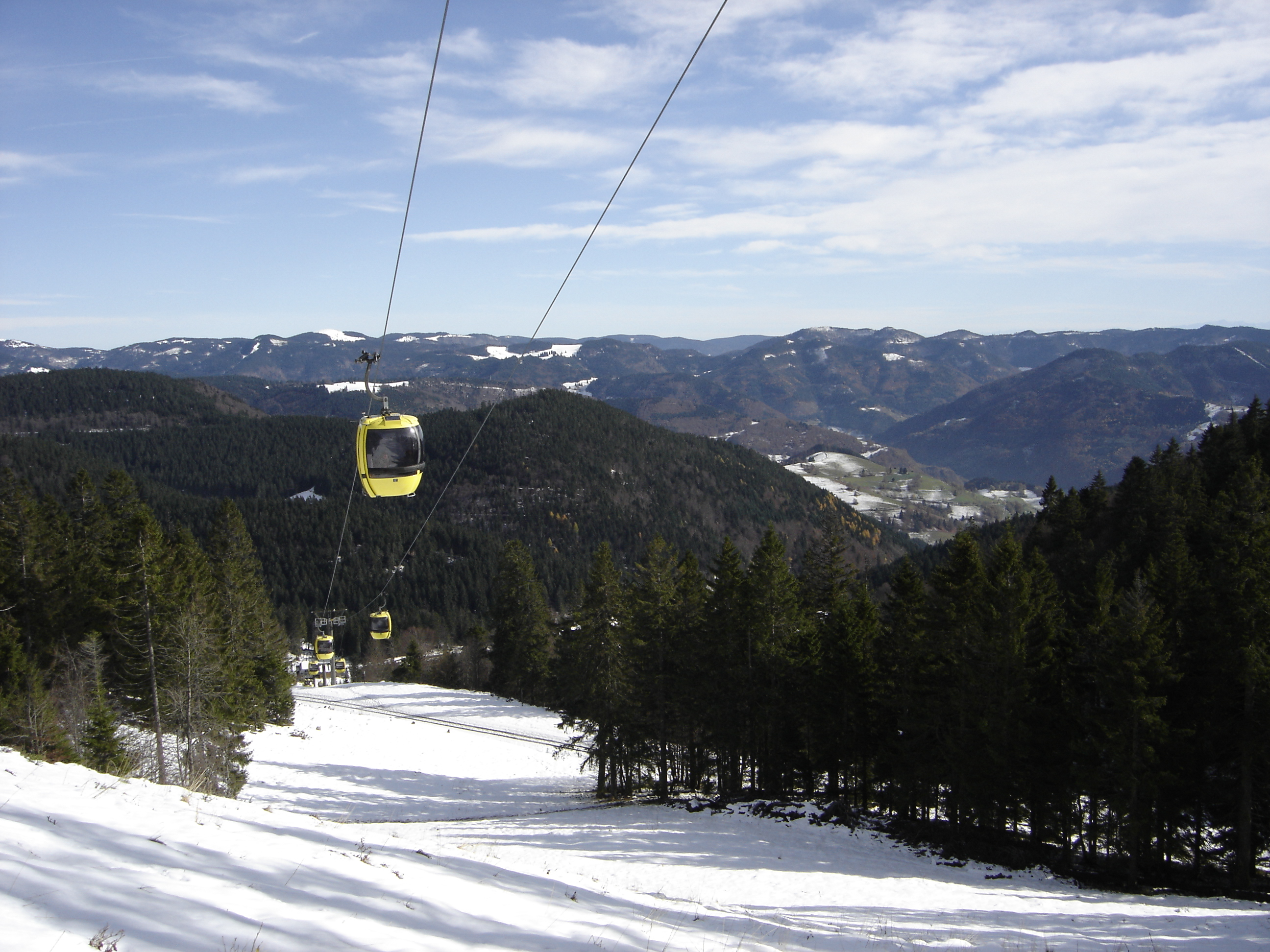
The dome of the Silberberg is visible immediately left of the Herzogenhorn (left, above the cable car cabins)

The central highlands of the Southern Black Forest are formed by the Feldberg region (1,493 m above NHN) in the north and the group of mountains around the Herzogenhorn in the south, both separated by the Feldberg Pass and the deep valley of Trogtal through which the upper Wiese runs. The rocky dome of the Silberberg drops steeply to the north by a good 550 metres forming one of the highest mountain faces in the Feldberg region. To the southeast the mountain is bounded by the upper reaches of the Prägbach. The latter runs parallel to the Wiese, but 400 metres above it, the southeastern mountainside descending only relatively gently. It transitions to the high pastures of the upper Prägbach valley. The forested northern mountainside is divided by cirque-like niches and craggy ridges that are like arêtes in places.

== Rocks and minerals ==
The Silberberg, like the whole upper Wiese valley is mostly made of paragneisses. Also present here, are several vein-line porphyry deposits, which were probably formed towards the end of the Variscan mountain building phase, and amphibolite. Both are very resistant to weathering and tend, therefore, to form crags. A number of mineral lodes run through the Silberberg with a total length of several kilometres and of medium thickness up to 1.2 metres. In the quartz, fluorspar, baryte, calcite and dolomite veins are galena, chalcopyrite and silver ores. The Silberberg is also the only place in the Black Forest to date where tremolite has been found.

== Mining ==
The name of the mountain recalls the silver mining of bygone years. It is part of the Todtnau mining region, in which silver was mined as early as the Middle Ages. The oldest record of ore mines on the Silberberg dates to 1028. In the western, neighbouring cirque of Zimmerwinkel the Dr. Tholus Brunnen gallery was worked by the Gewerkschaft Finstergrund from 1968 until 1970 in order to extract fluorite and baryte.

== Tourism ==
A rock path runs up the steep, northern slopes of the Silberberg that was originally blazed by the Black Forest Club but, like the Alpine Path on the Feldberg has been abandoned. The very varied footpath has a few exposed sections but is still passible.
