= Herzogenhorn =

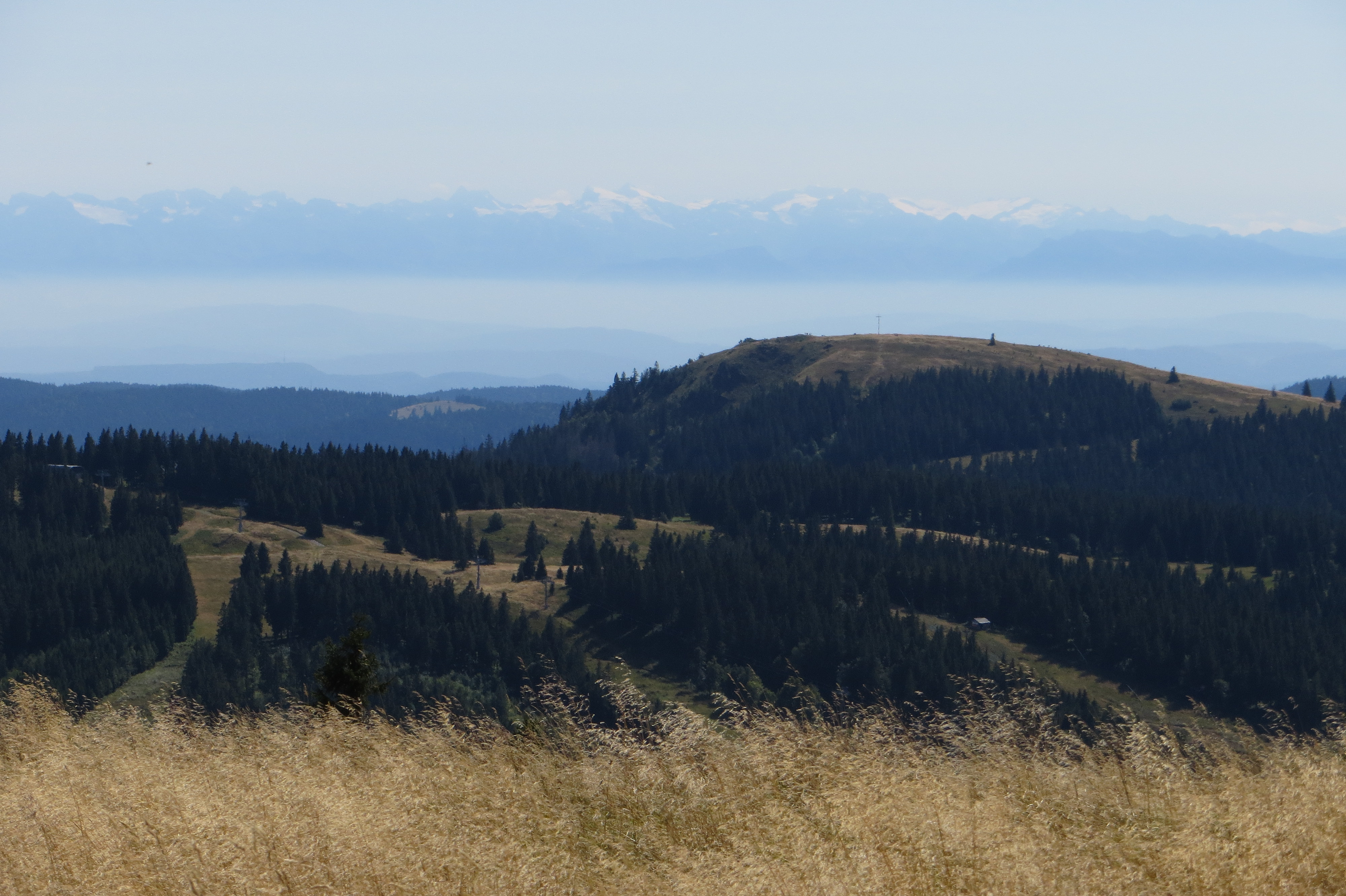
- The Herzogenhorn seen from the Feldberg. The Alps may be seen in the far distance.

Highest point
- Elevation: 1,415 m (4,642 ft)
- Prominence: 184 m (604 ft)Feldberg Pass
- Isolation: 3Seebuck
- Coordinates: 47°50′06″N 8°01′10″E

Geography
- Location within Germany
- Location: Baden-Württemberg, Germany
- Parent range: Black Forest

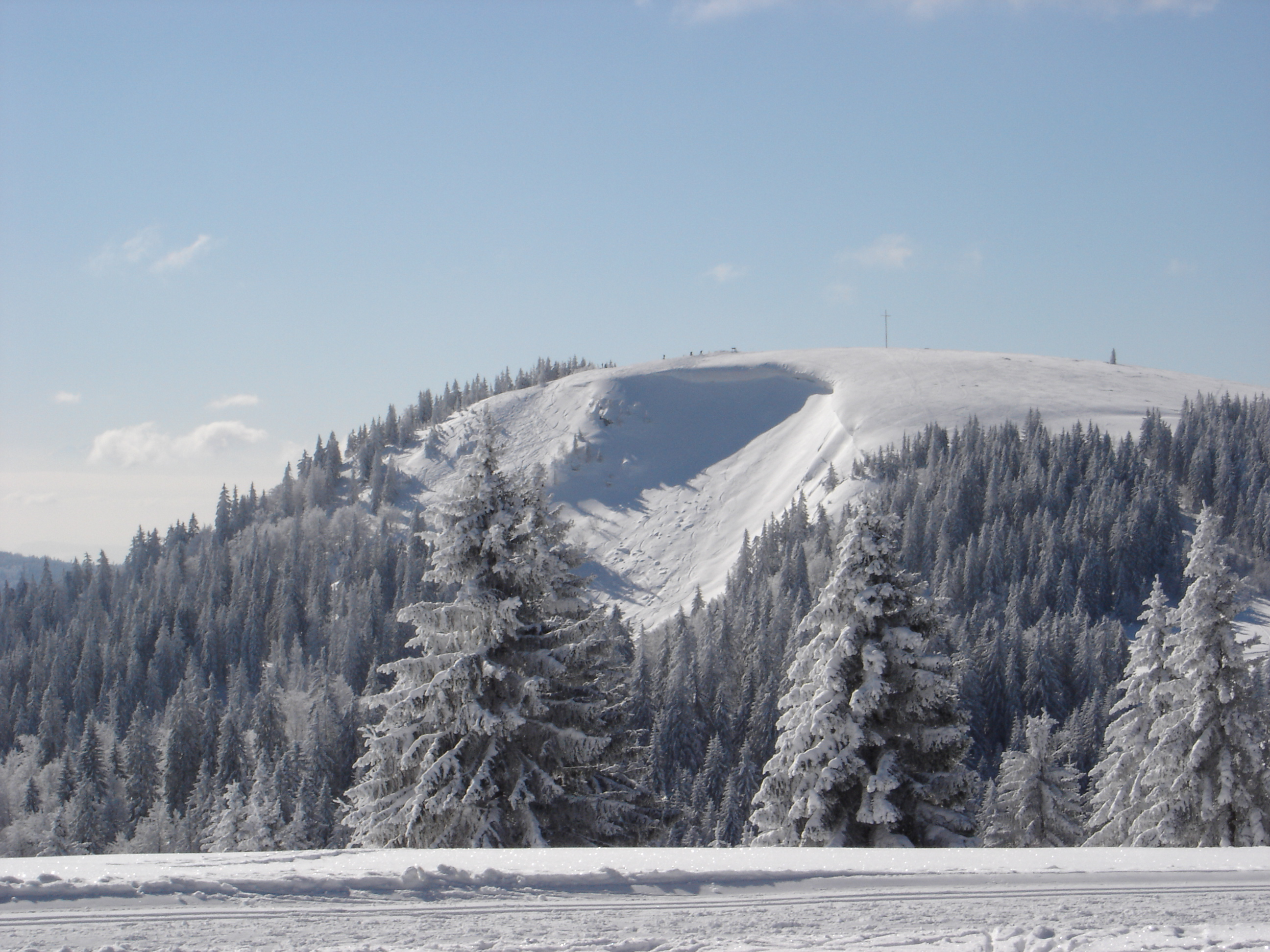
The Herzogenhorn in winter

The Herzogenhorn is a mountain, 1,415.2 m above sea level (NHN), in the southwest German state of Baden-Württemberg. It lies within a nature reserve in the municipality of Bernau im Schwarzwald.

== Location and surrounding area ==
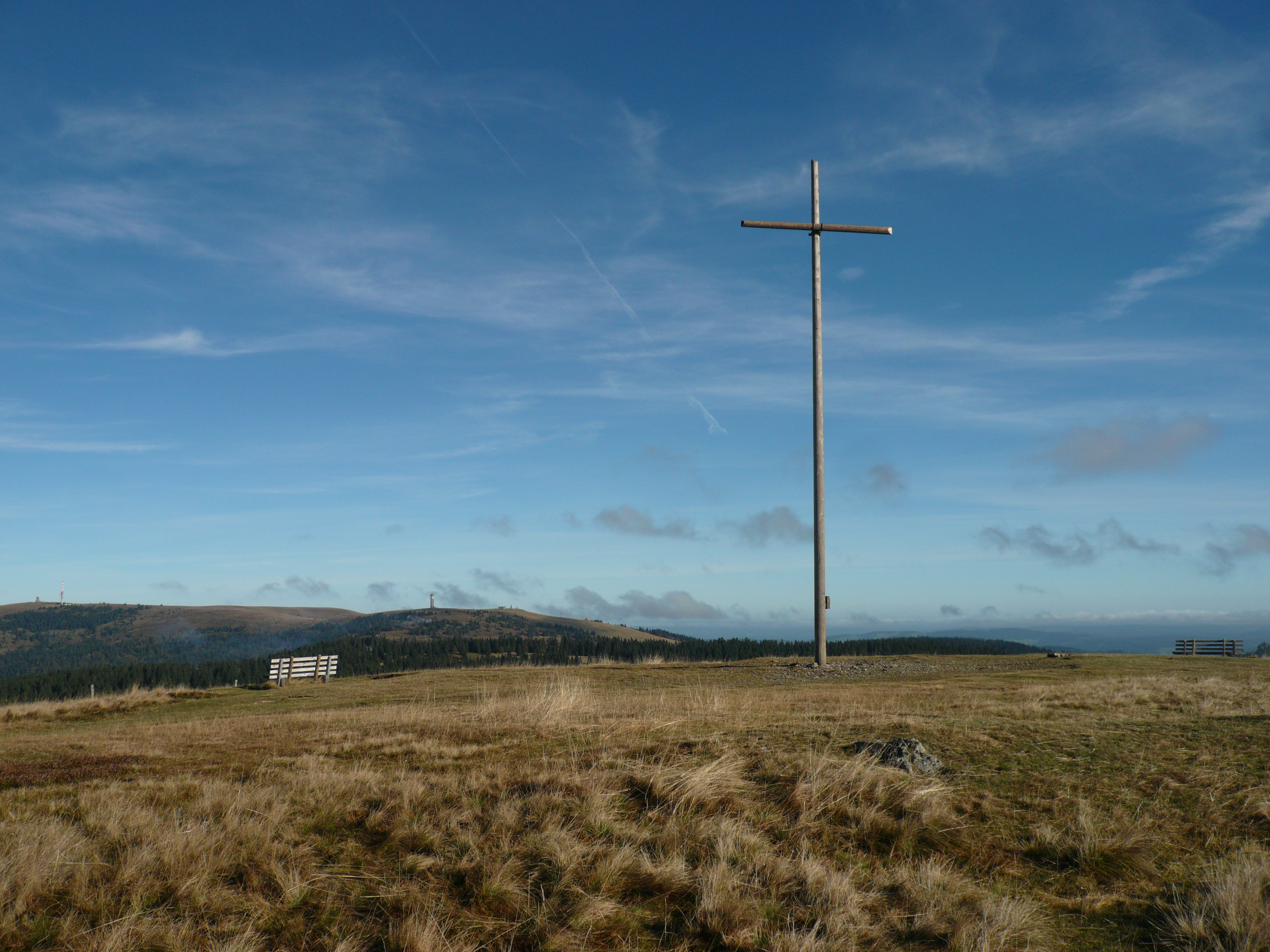
At the summit of the Herzogenhorn

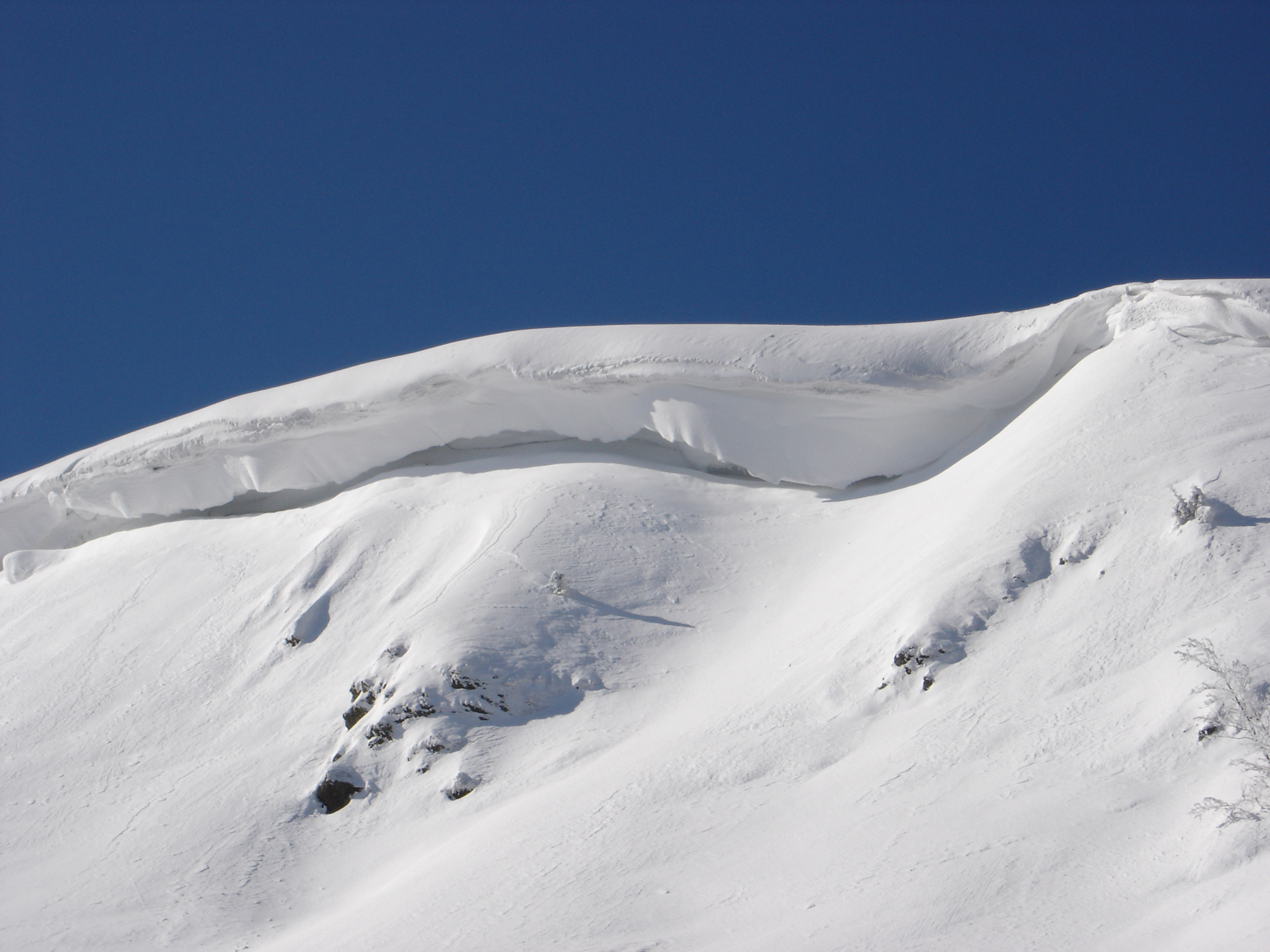
The Herzogenhornwächte in February 2006

The Herzogenhorn is the source region for three streams, the Krunkelbach, the Kriegsbach and the Prägbach, which discharge into the Wiese.

== Height ==
The Herzogenhorn is the third highest mountain in the Black Forest, after the Feldberg and the Seebuck.

If the Baldenweger Buck is counted, the Herzogenhorn is only the fourth highest point in the Black Forest. But if only mountains with a prominence of 100 metres are counted as independent peaks, it becomes the second highest after the Feldberg.

The Herzogenhorn is the highest mountain in the Black Forest to have a summit cross.

== Routes to the summit ==
On the Herzogenhorn is an extensive network of trails. The mountain is usually ascended from Bernau, from Menzenschwand (roughly heading over the Spießhorn Pass), or from the Feldberg Pass via the Grafenmatt. The two mountain ridges radiating from the Herzogenhorn, south towards St. Blasien and west via the Bernauer Kreuz to Hasenhorn near Todtnau are popular hiking areas.

From the Herzogenhorn, as well as the Feldberg to the north and Belchen to the west, there is a panoramic view in fine weather of the chain of the Alps from the Zugspitze to the southeast to Mont Blanc to the southwest. To the west are the Vosges may be seen beyond the Rhine Plain. The prominent high summit cross of the Herzogenhorn is about 75 minutes walk from the Feldberg Pass.

There are two restaurants on the mountain: one attached to the Herzogenhorn National Training Centre, a training centre for high-performance sports and the Krunkelbach Hut south-east of the summit.

== History ==
The mountain is already mentioned in a 1328 scroll as "des herzogen horne" as a point on the boundary of the abbey of St. Blaise The first primitive fortifications probably date to the time around the Thirty Years' War, whilst the construction of the fortification line of schanzen on the mountain is attributed to Margrave Louis William, "Turkish Louis". In 1904, the Mannheim branch of the Black Forest Club built the Mannheim-Ludwigshafen Hut, but this burned down on 28 January 1911. The Herzogenhorn inn was bought in 1957 from the Black Forest Ski Club, was converted and then opened on 22 October 1967 as the new National Training Centre. On 1 January 1979, the first 5 km, ladies cross-country skiing World Cup races in Europe took place on the Herzogenhorn after the Brend ski club had to move due to lack of snow. During the Second World War, military exercises were carried out on the Herzogenhorn and Baldenweger Buck, for example for snipers. In the vicinity of the National Training Centre is the Molerhüsli in which Freiburg artist, Karl Hauptmann, lived and worked from 1920 until his death in 1947. Another artist who worked on the Herzogenhorn worked was Wilhelm Heimer Wickert (1886-1968).

== Winter Sports ==
=== Cross-country skiing ===
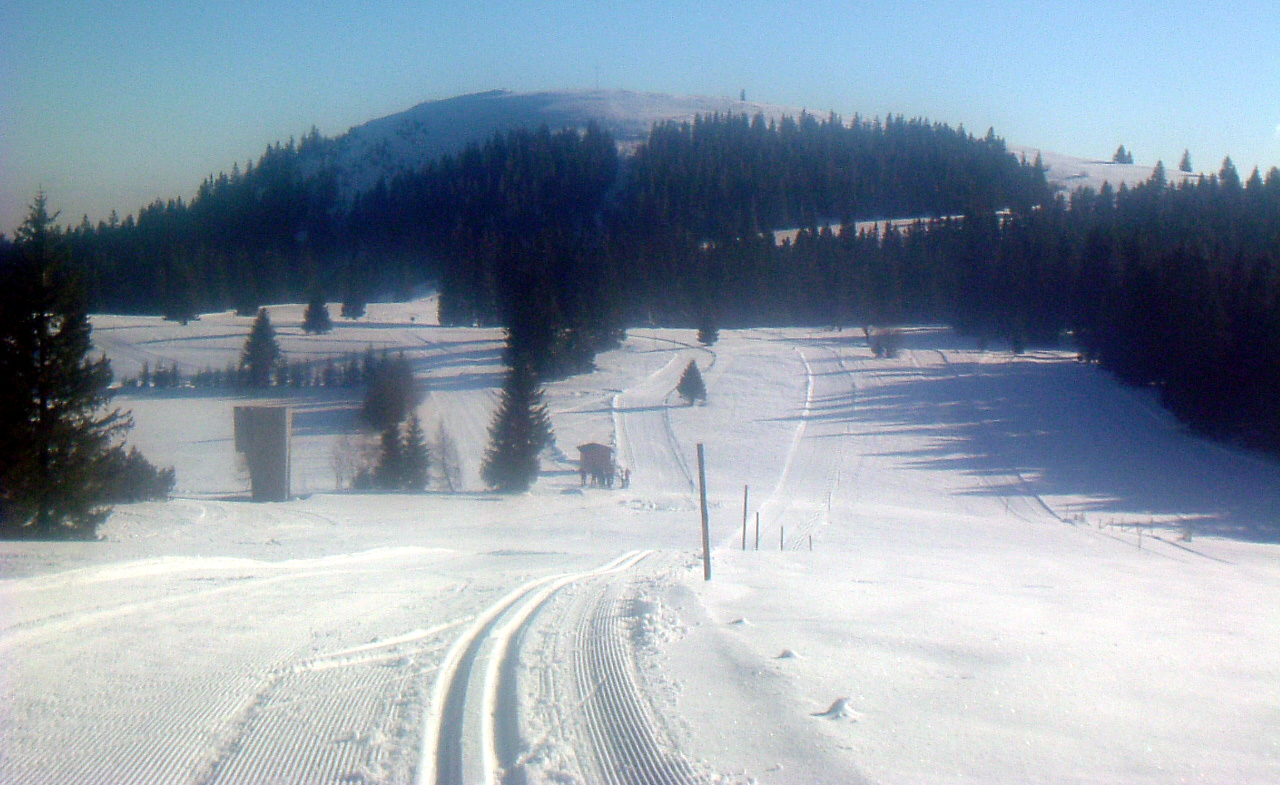
View over the trail looking south to the Herzogenhorn. Left the climbing wall of the National Training Centre

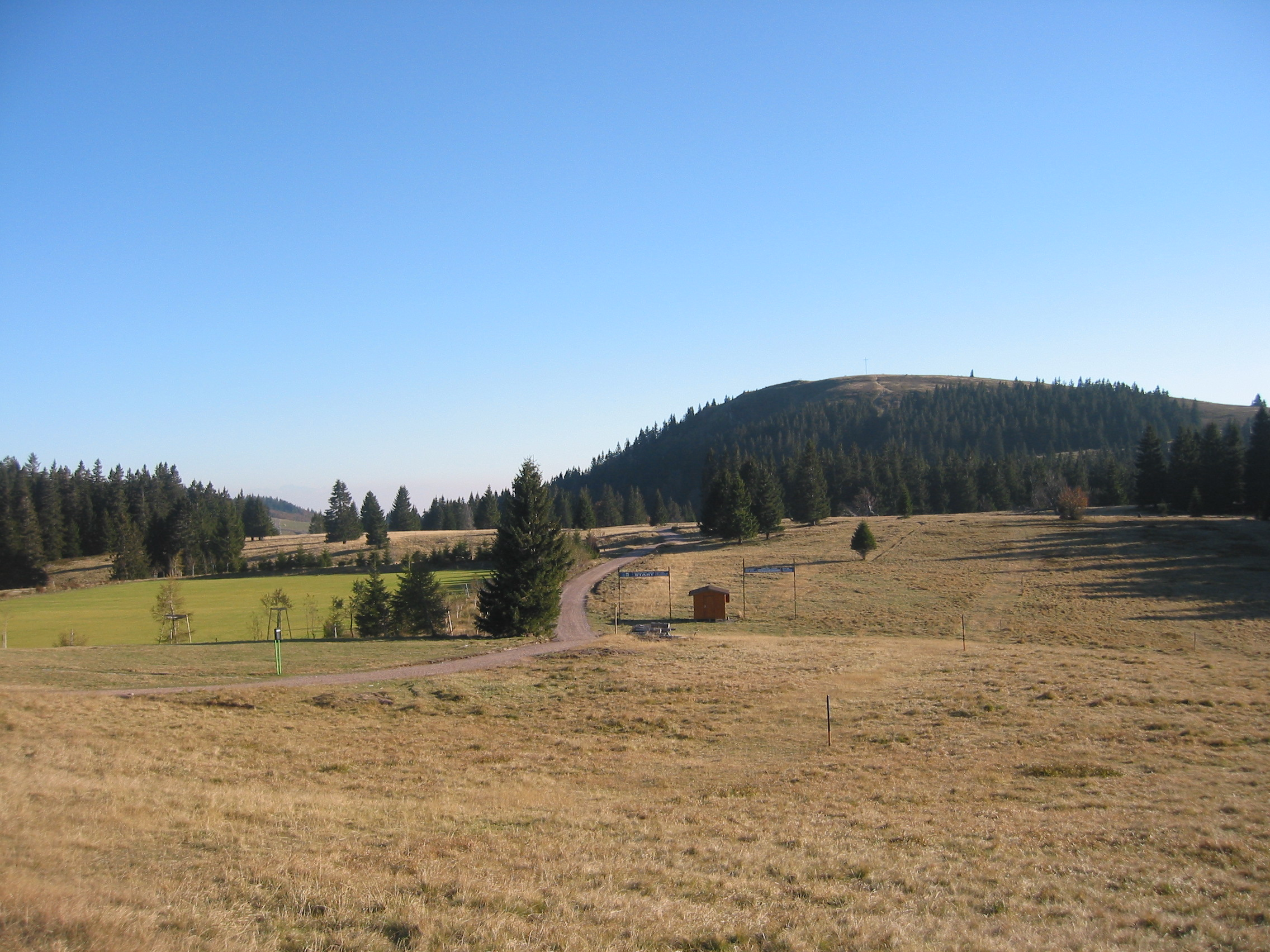
The Herzogenhorn in October from the north with the cross-country area of the National Training Centre in the foreground

On the Herzogenhorn is an extensive network of cross country skiing training trails. The routes starting at the National Training Centre (about 15–20 km, depending on snow conditions) lead in tight loops across the hilly plateau between the Herzogenhorn, Grafenmatt and Silberberg and are the highest loipen in the Black Forest (approx 1,350 m). They are therefore often used for training. The trails, which are all challenging, are accessible from the Feldberg Pass over the Grafenmatt lift or by crossing the alpine slopes of Grafenmatt in about 20 minutes on a groomed forest path.

=== Downhill skiing ===
The Alpine skiing area is not on the Herzogenhorn itself, but on the slopes between the neighbouring Grafenmatt and the Feldberg Pass. Below the Herzogenhorn is, however, the start of the "Hinterwaldabfahrt", a 7-km-long downhill run into the Wiese valley, that ends in Todtnau.

== Literature ==
- August Vetter: Feldberg im Schwarzwald. Selbstverlag der Gemeinde Feldberg (Schwarzwald), 1996, Literature by and about Herzogenhorn in the German National Library catalogue.
