= Krunkelbach Pit =

Grube Krunkelbach Grube Krunkelbach Hans Paul Pit (Grube Hans Paul)
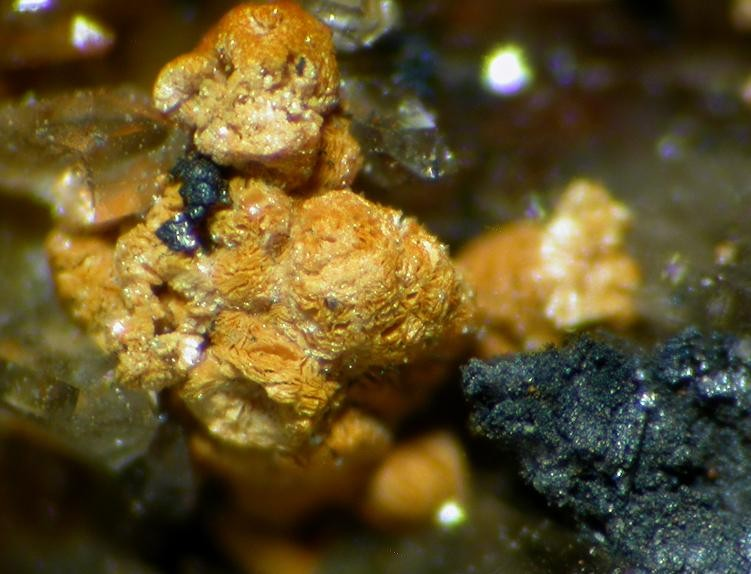
- Urano-tungstite from the type locality of Grube Krunkelbach (image width: 3 mm)

- Location within Germany
- Location: Menzenschwand, ,
- Products: Pechblende
- Opened: 1961
- Active: Grube Krunkelbach; Hans Paul Pit (Grube Hans Paul)
- Closed: 1991
- Company: Gewerkschaft Brunhilde

The Krunkelbach Pit (German: Grube Krunkelbach), also known as the Hans Paul Pit (Grube Hans Paul), was a mine established to investigate a uranium deposit in the High Black Forest near the municipality of Menzenschwand, today part of St. Blasien in the county of Waldshut in the south German state of Baden-Württemberg. Located on the edge of the nature reserve of Feldberg, operation of the mine was abandoned between 1961 and 1991 due to protests from local residents, conservationists and environmentalists as well as the anti-nuclear movement. In the 1970s, plans to use water from the pit that contained radon in order to build an exclusive health spa around Menzenschwand, were cancelled. Since 2005, water from the uranium ore deposit has been used to run a radon bath in Menzenschwand.

Mineral diversity is very high: >95 minerals were found here. It is a type locality of Arsenuranospathite, Chadwickite, Metakahlerite, Metakirchheimerite, Metauranospinite Pharmacolite.

== Literature ==
- Armin Simon: Der Streit um das Schwarzwald-Uran. Die Auseinandersetzung um den Uranbergbau in Menzenschwand im Südschwarzwald 1960–1991. (=Alltag & Provinz, Vol. 11) publ. Arbeitskreis Regionalgeschichte Freiburg e.V. Donzelli-Kluckert Verlag, Bremgarten, 2003, ISBN 3-933284-11-2.
- Helge Steen: Geschichte des modernen Bergbaus im Schwarzwald. Books on Demand, Norderstedt, 2004, ISBN 3-8334-1653-X.
- Gregor Markl, Stephan Wolfsried: Das Uran von Menzenschwand. Geschichte · Lagerstätte · Mineralien. Christian Weise, Munich, 2011, ISBN 978-3-921656-77-8.
