= Hasenhorn =

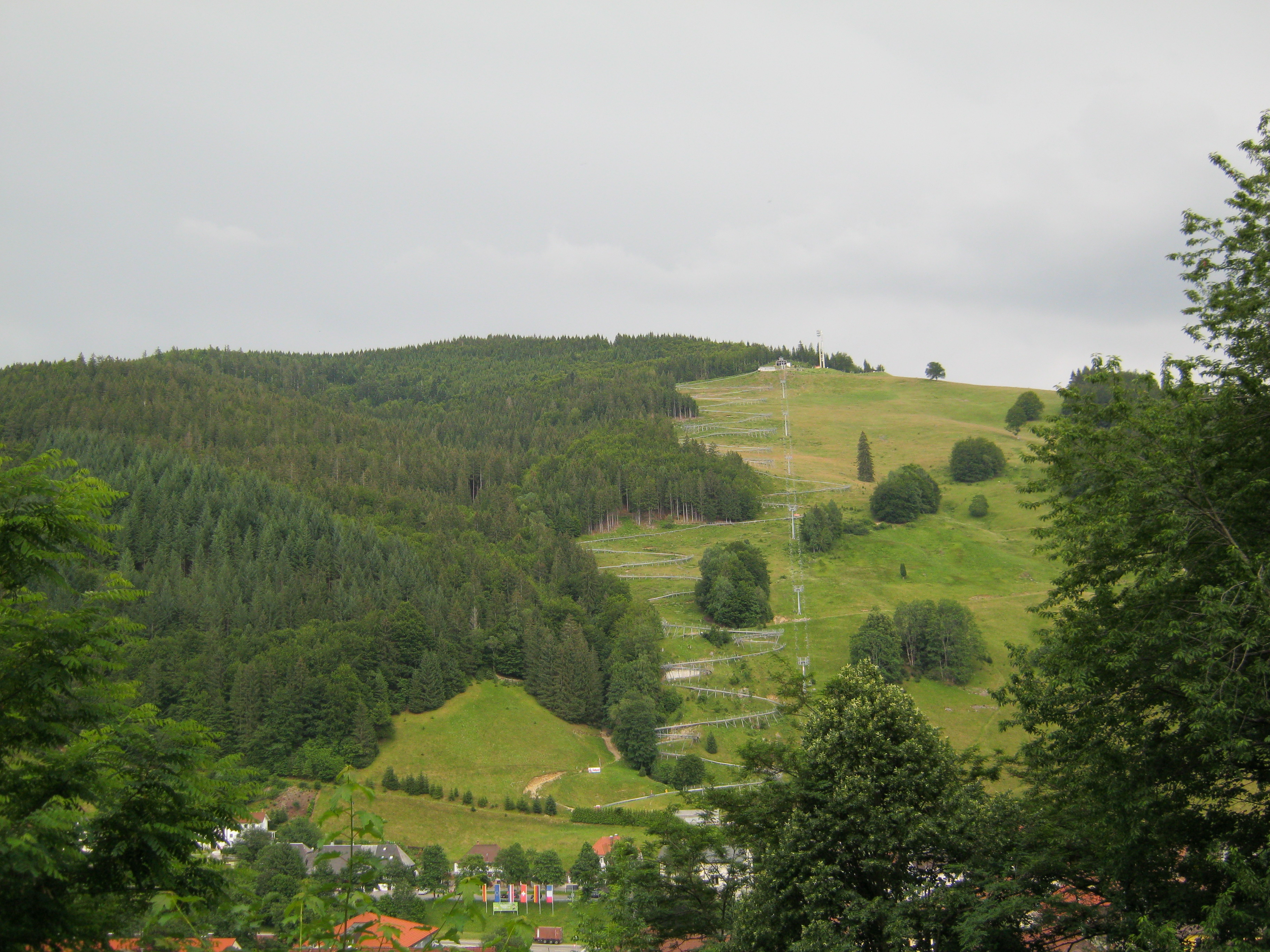
- Hasenhorn - view from the refuge hut above the church of St. John the Baptist

Highest point
- Elevation: 1,156 m (3,793 ft)
- Coordinates: 47°49′16.6″N 07°57′6.54″E

Geography
- Location within Baden-Württemberg
- Location: Baden-Württemberg, Germany
- Parent range: Southern Black Forest

The Hasenhorn is a mountain, 1,155.6 m above sea level (NHN), in the Southern Black Forest in Germany. The mountain lies southeast of the little town of Todtnau.

In 2004, the old single chairlift on the Hasenhorn was removed and replaced by modern double chairlift. At the same time, an all-weather toboggan run (Rodelbahn) was built on the Hasenhorn, at the time the longest of its kind in Germany. The run is owned by an investor who also owns the Steinwasen Park. In addition, on the Hasenhorn there are suitable downhill runs and, in winter, a prepared toboggan run. In the vicinity of the chairlift's top station is a restaurant, the Berggasthaus Hasenhorn.

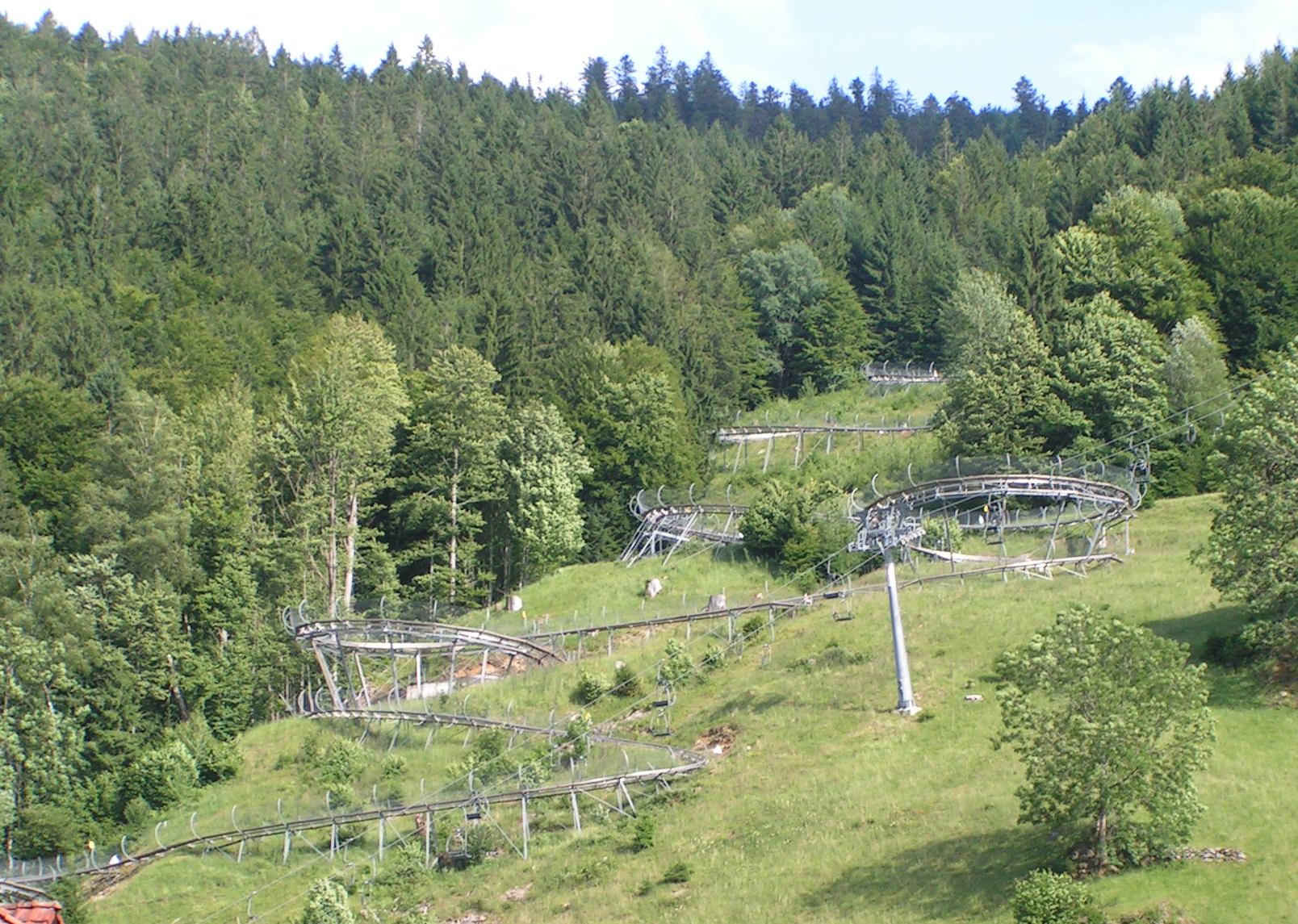
The all-weather toboggan run

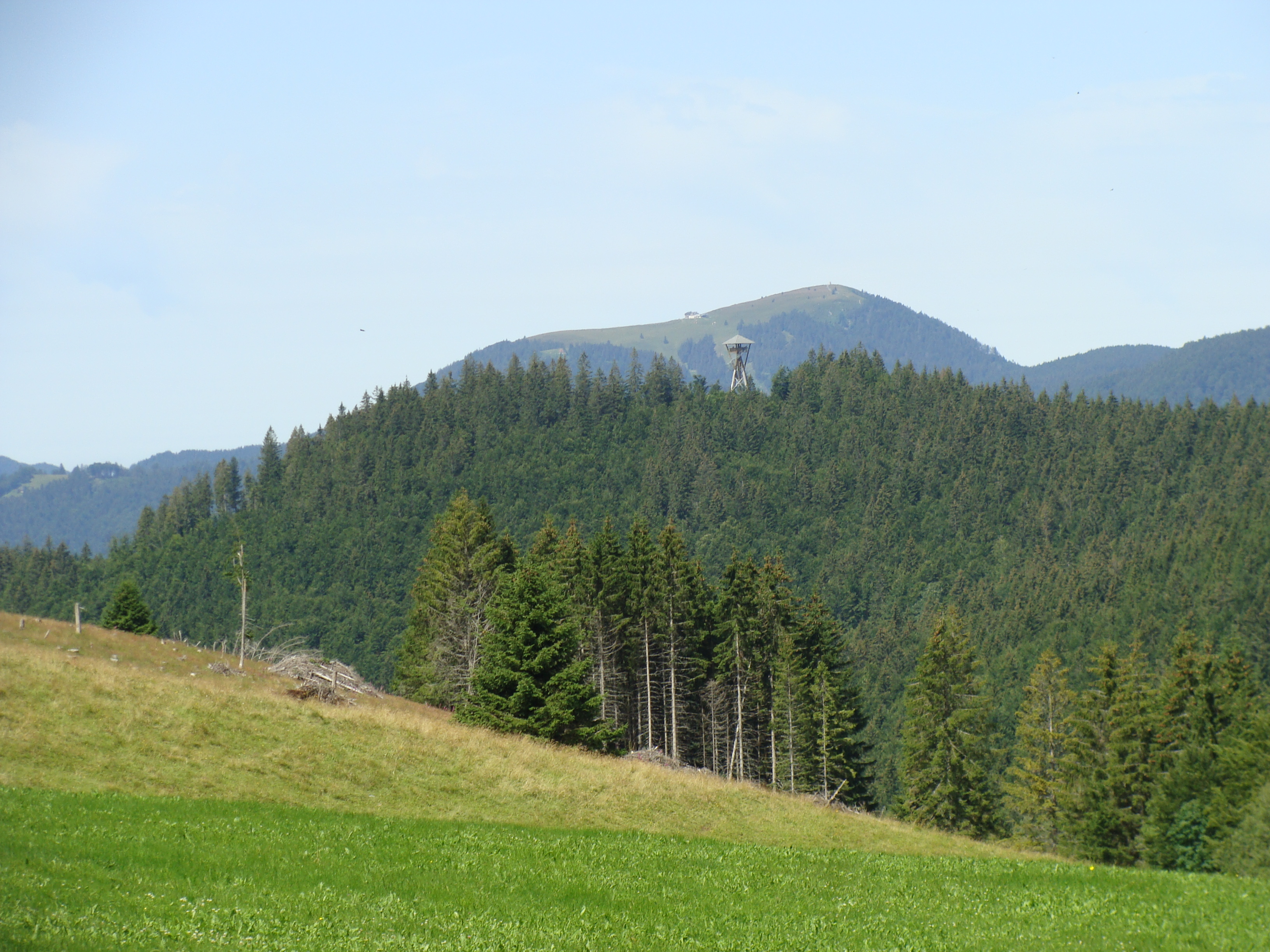
The Hasenhorn and its tower (seen from the Gisibodenalm)

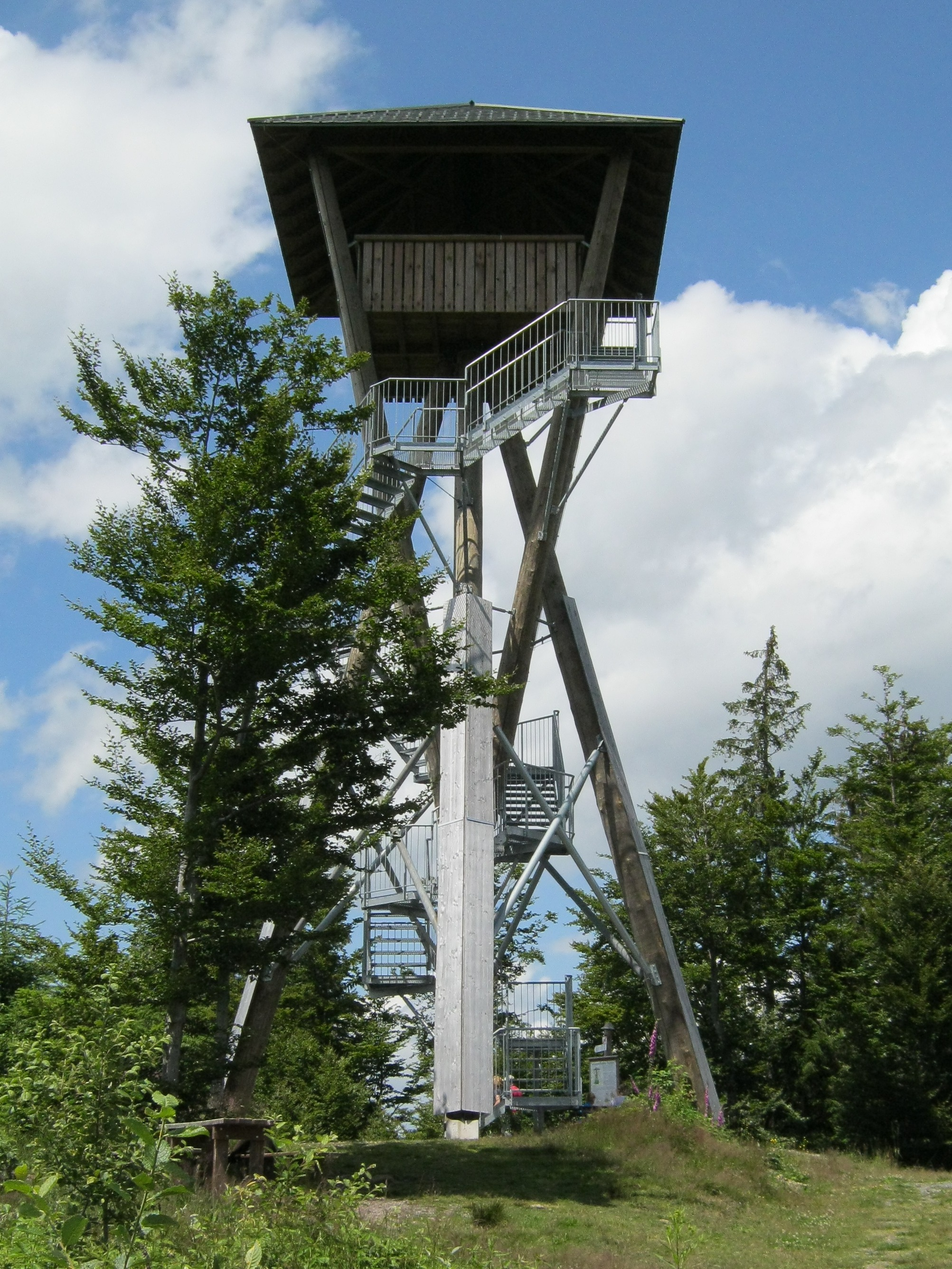
The Hasenhorn Tower
