= Hans Friedrichs =

German politician

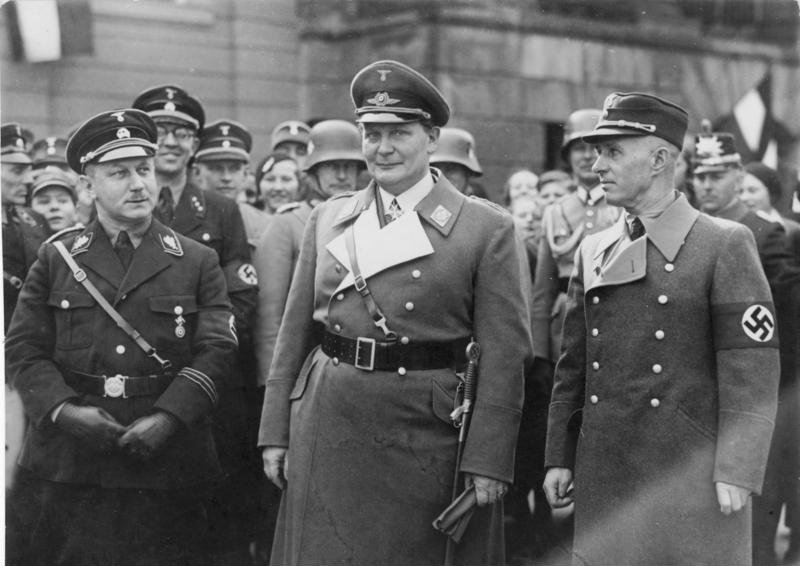
- Hans Friedrichs (right), with Hermann Göring (centre), and Wilhelm Kube (left) at Friedrichs' inauguration as mayor of Potsdam. March 10, 1934

Mayor of Potsdam
- In office 1934–1945
- Preceded by: Arno Rauscher
- Succeeded by: Walter Paul

Personal details
- Born: November 9, 1875; Demmin, German Empire
- Died: April 11, 1962 (aged 86); Merano, Italy
- Political party: Nazi Party (1932–1945)

Military service
- Allegiance: Weimar Republic (1918–1929); German Empire (1894–1918)
- Branch/service: Reichswehr (1918–1929); Imperial German Army (1894–1918)
- Rank: Major general
- Unit: Prussian Guards Corps; 3rd Foot Guards
- Battles/wars: First World War; Western Front; Second Battle of the Aisne

Hans Friedrichs (November 9, 1875 – April 11, 1962) was a German military officer and politician. Between 1934 and 1945 he was mayor of Potsdam.

== Life ==
Friedrichs was born on November 9, 1875, in Demmin. He enlisted in the Imperial German Army in 1894, aged 19. Friedrichs served in the First World War, initially with the 3rd Foot Guards of the Prussian Guards Corps. From August 1916 he was a Captain and commander of the Assault Battalion No. 7. In this role Friedrichs participated in battles for the Chemin des Dames ridge.

After the conclusion of the First World War, Friedrichs remained in the post-war Reichswehr of the Weimar Republic. He was promoted to colonel and was assigned to Ohrdruf to supervise military training. In 1929 he retired from the Reichswehr, now ranked Major general, and moved to Potsdam.

Friedrichs joined the Nazi Party on August 1, 1932 (membership number 1,228,347). From 1933 to 1937 he served as the party's Kreisleiter for Potsdam.

In 1945, Friedrichs fled to southwestern Germany due to the advance of the Red Army. He settled in Menzenschwand in the Black Forest.

Friedrichs died on April 11, 1962, in Merano, Italy.

== Mayor of Potsdam ==
In 1934, he became mayor of Potsdam. Friedrichs would remain mayor until the conclusion of the Second World War in 1945.

As mayor, Friedrichs deviated from Nazi architecture, preferring instead to focus on expanding urban green space. Urban green spaces and parkland expanded from 323,485 m^{2} in 1934 to 1,876,571 m^{2} in 1940. As a result, relatively few examples of Nazi architecture can be found in Potsdam, relative to other German cities. Those structures that do exist exhibit more subdued examples of the Stripped Classicist motifs central to Nazi architecture. One of the few remaining architectural legacies of his tenure is the Dienstgebäude der Wasserstraßendirektion Kurmark (Berliner Straße 98–101), designed by Werner March. Several of the buildings constructed under Friedrichs were repurposed in the 1990s for Fachhochschule Potsdam (Potsdam University of Applied Sciences). These include the former Presidential Building of the German Red Cross and the Adolf Hitler Barracks complex.

After the conclusion of the Second World War, he was succeeded as mayor of Potsdam by Walter Paul of the Communist Party of Germany.
