= Feldberg Pass =

Mountain pass in Baden-Württemberg, Germany

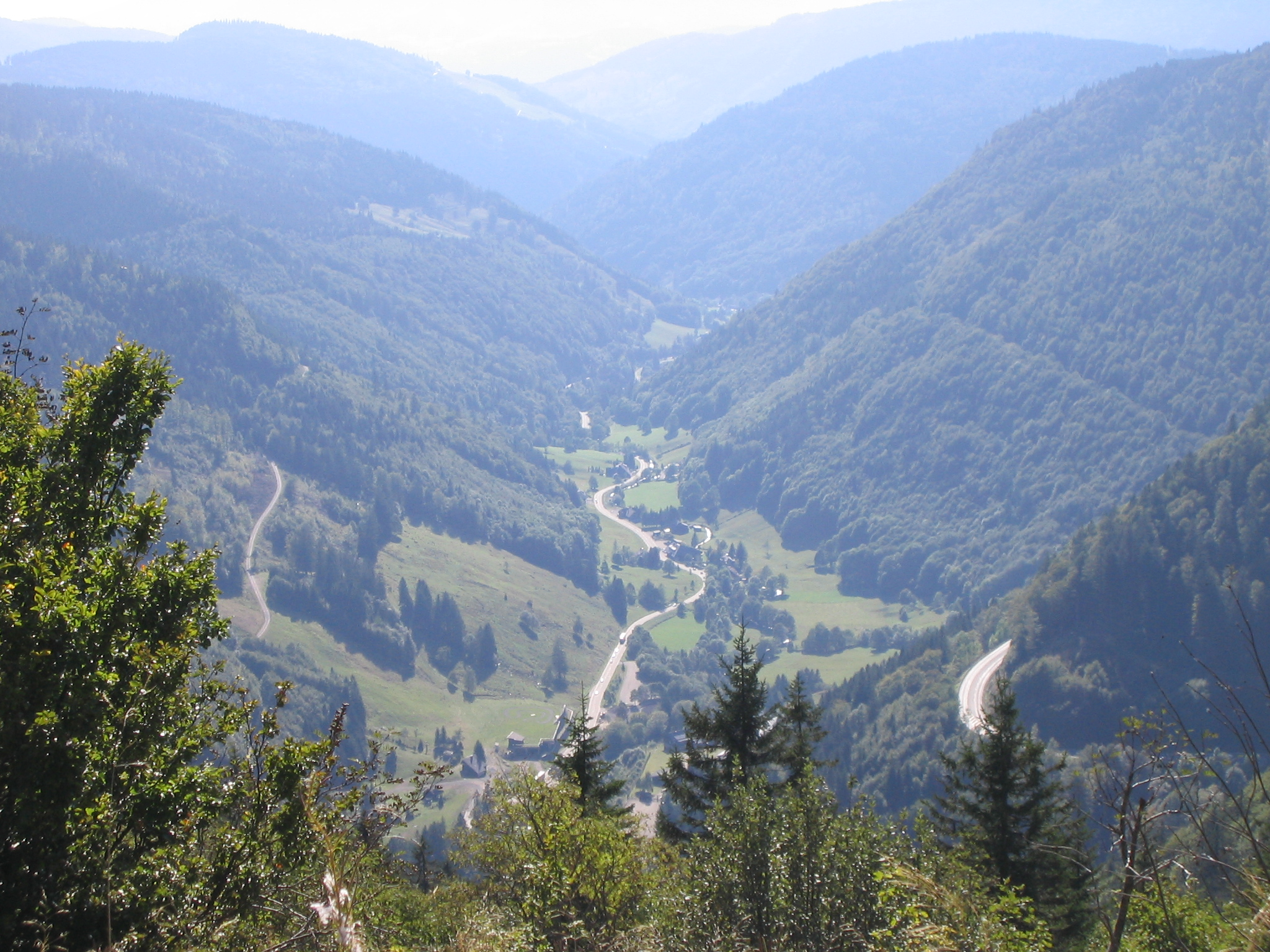
- View from the Feldberg looking towards Brandenberg-Fahl. The pass road is on the right.

- Location within Alps
- Elevation: 1,231 metres (4,039 ft)
- Traversed by: B 317 federal highway

Third Approach
- Location: Feldberg, Breisgau-Hochschwarzwald District (Landkreis Breisgau-Hochschwarzwald), Baden-Württemberg, Germany
- Coordinates: 47°51′30″N 8°03′10″E

The Feldberg Pass (el. 1231 m.) is a high mountain pass in the Black Forest in the state of Baden-Württemberg and the second highest in Germany.

It is south of the Feldberg peak, and the road runs through the town of Feldberg. The B 317 federal highway connects Todtnau and Titisee-Neustadt. The maximum incline is 1 in 10 (10%).

== History ==
The first discussions about the construction of a road over the Feldberg took place around 1840 in Wiesental. The local communities wanted a link to the Baar, as did local industry because they sourced their raw materials from the Baar and the upper part of Württemberg (brush industry) as well as from Austria (tinder industry) and wanted to open up new markets. Hitherto, raw materials had to be delivered by road over the pass of Hohe Wacht (Bernau) and along the Prägbach valley. Shortly before the Baden Revolution, a mule track was laid from Todtnau via Zeiger and Bärental to Altglashütten and connected with roads to Lenzkirch and St. Blasien. In 1847, the state had assessed the road project as important, but there were disputes over its financing, which was to be provided by the Principality of Fürstenberg and the neighbouring municipalities. In 1866, a government subsidy of 20,000 guilders was granted, and, in 1868, Bärental and the House of Fürstenberg agreed on an extension of the road to the border with Menzenschwand. In 1874, preparatory work got under way and the road was opened in 1885. It was not cleared in winter, but used by snowshoe walkers, skaters and pedestrians.

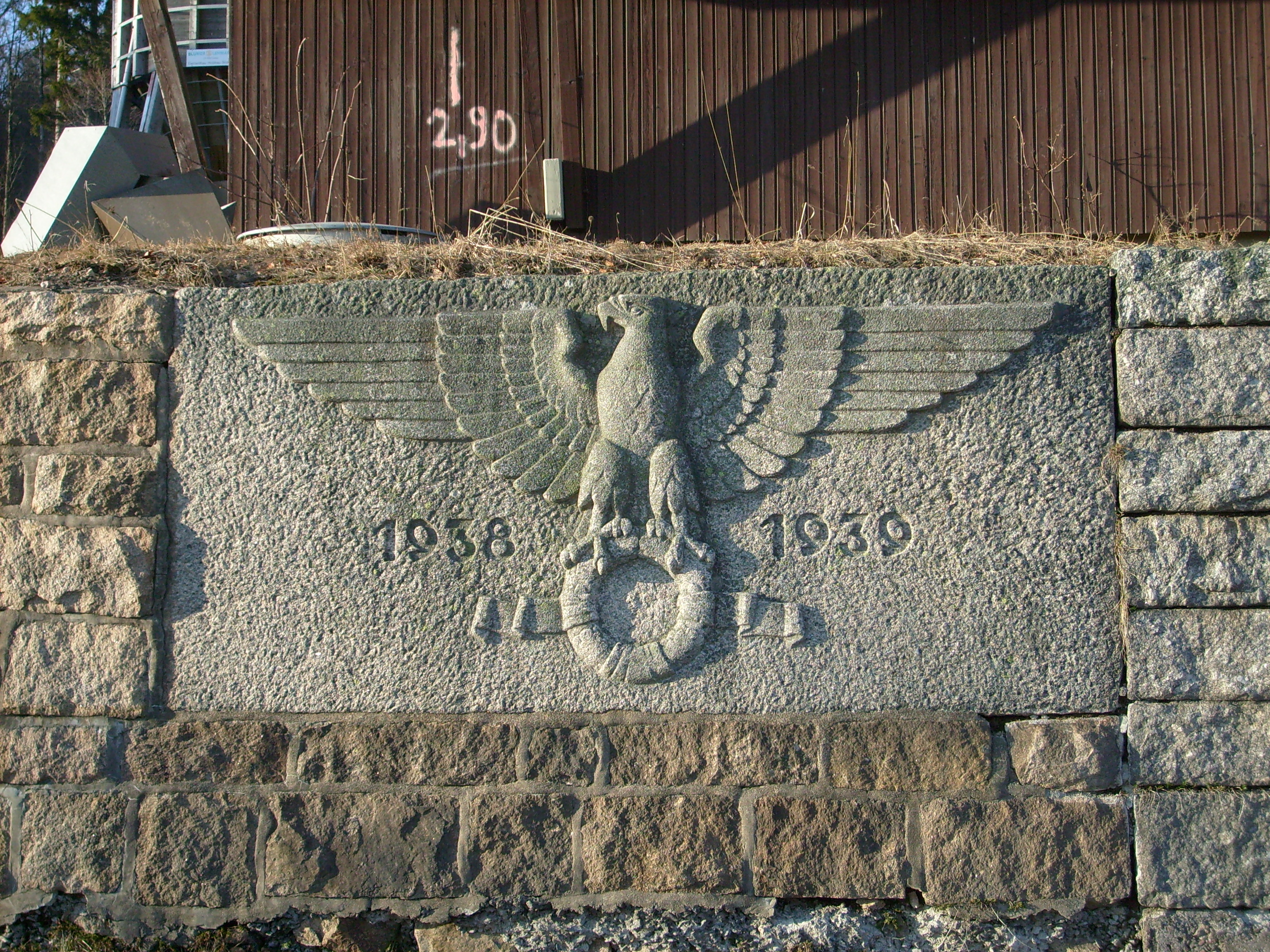
Plaque and Reichsadler commemorating the building of the highway depot in 1938/39

In 1908, plans were drawn up to widen the road, but they initially failed to secure funding from the parishes. In 1912, the parish of Bärental was committed to make a contribution and work began in 1913, which led to it being widened by 33%, and its gradient reduced from an average of 10.3 to 7.85%. On 1 April 1926, it was classified as a Kreisstraße and, on 1 April 1935, it became a Reichsstraße, later the Bundesstraße 317. In 1927 the connection through the Seewald was made navigable, and, in 1932/34, it was tarmacked for the first time. In 1938/39 large car parks and a highway depot was built in the area around the Zeiger.

== Transport ==
The busy pass road is part of the B 317 and links Todtnau in the Wiesental valley with Titisee-Neustadt. The southwestern approach is characterized by hairpin bends and climbs 483 metres over a distance of about seven kilometres; the north-eastern ramp is less winding. Both approaches have gradients of up to 1 in 10 or 10%. In snow conditions, lorries are required to fit snow chains. In the area of the pass two more mountain roads branch off; one runs north to the Feldberg mountain and another south to the National Training Centre of the DSV on the Herzogenhorn (1,415 m (4,642 ft 4 1/2 in) DE-NN). In the winter of 2005/2006, the road was blocked after heavy snow for avalanche blasting.

== Tourism ==
In the summer, the Feldberg Pass is often the starting point for walks in the Feldberg nature reserve, for which numerous car parks have been established. As tourism has developed, a large number of restaurants and places to stay have been built, as well as lifts, especially for winter sports.

For the last few decades, there have been winter sports areas at Feldberg on both sides of the pass. They include 14 lifts and 16 slopes, from simple family runs to sophisticated FIS World Cup routes. Using a Feldberg Pass, cross-country skiers have access to the trails at the Herzogenhorn (about 20 km), the Köpfle (3 km), Äulemer Kreuz and the Stübenwasen track. The 32 -kilometre-long Hinterzarten to Schluchsee long-distance cross country trail runs over the Feldberg Pass.

The high level of tourist traffic in the area of the Feldberg Pass causes major problems, especially in winter, something often exacerbated by wintry road conditions. Currently, a multi-storey car park is being built at the Pass by the foot of the Seebuck, which is designed to relieve parking along the road.

The Feldberg Pass has twice been a mountaintop finish on the Deutschland Tour cycle race. In the mountains classification the eastern approach counts as a Category 1. In 2003, the stage was won by the Portuguese José Azevedo and in 2005 by the Australian Cadel Evans.

== See also ==
- List of highest paved roads in Europe
- List of mountain passes
