= Steinwasen Park =

Theme park in Germany

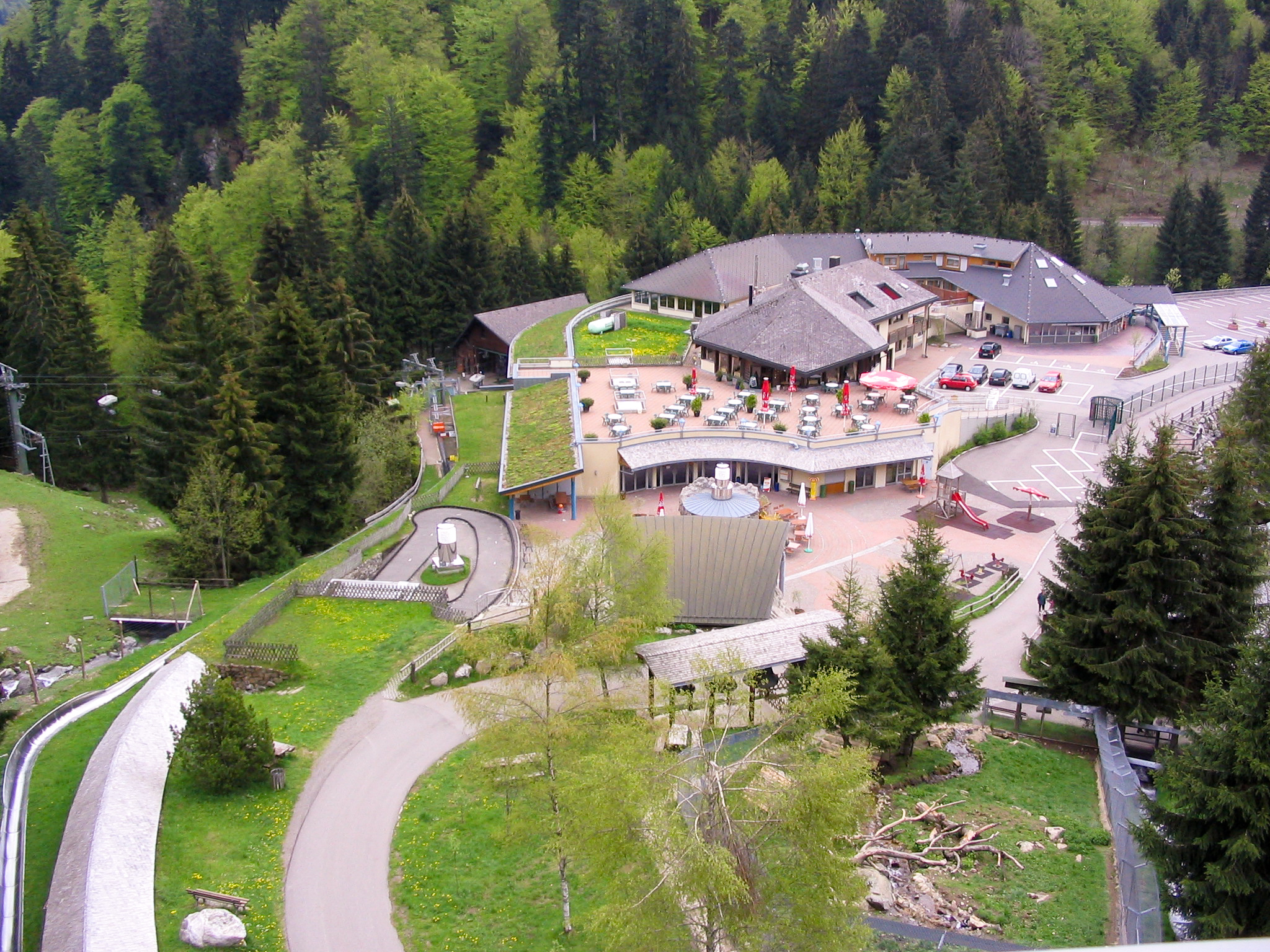
- View of Steinwasen Park from the suspension bridge (2004)
- Interactive map of Steinwasen Park
- Location: Freiburg im Breisgau, Baden-Württemberg, Germany
- Coordinates: 47.8997°N 7.9222°E
- Opened: 1974

Steinwasen Park is a theme park with a small zoo in the Black Forest, about 20 km southeast of Freiburg im Breisgau. It is located at the mountain pass Notschrei between Kirchzarten and Todtnau. The area belongs to the town of Oberried.

Several animal enclosures and fun rides are spread over an area of 35 hectares. The park is integrated into the natural mountain landscape and takes the Black Forest as a central theme. There is, for example, a film about the historic formation of the mountains, as well as a museum showing model replicas of the characteristic Black Forest houses.

Steinwasen Park is open from mid March to early November and is particularly attractive for young families.

== History ==
The Steinwasen Park area was first mentioned in the church register of Kirchzarten in 1618, as the place of birth of one Simon Wiestler. In the middle of the 17th century, a simple homestead was built on the grounds of Steinwasen Park. Due to its convenient position on a mountain pass leading through the Black Forest, the park gained importance in the 19th century when a post office with an inn was built there.

In 1970 the last landlords, the Kreutz family, sold the property to the construction company Adolf Braun, who transformed it, with the help of wildlife biologists, into a wildlife park. The park opened its doors in 1974. In 1979, a chair lift and two summer toboggan runs were added, one of which was roofed in 1989.

A new main building was erected in 1996 and the fun rides Spacerunner and Gletscherblitz ("Glacier Lightning") were opened two years later.

In 2000, the Black Forest cinema was added, showing their own production of the formation of the Black Forest natural landscape. The following year, the world's longest rope bridge, now even listed in the Guinness Book of Records, was opened.

The water ride Riversplash and the adventure playground Schneeburg Steinwasen opened in 2008. In 2011, a 4D cinema was added.

== Attractions ==
=== Park ===
The world's largest suspension bridge with a length of 218 meters stretches across the valley of the park. In 2004, the bridge was included as part of the race track of the Black Forest Ultra Bike Marathon.

There is a Black Forest diorama and a second cinema showing fairy-tale movies for little children, as well as another fun ride on the upper floor of the main building: a ride through the darkness named Legendary Black Forest Train. The Black Forest cinema, which takes the visitors on a journey through the primeval landscape of Southern Germany, can also be found there.

Over 30 different wild animals, such as red deer, lynxes, marmots, chamois, ibexes, and mouflon, live in their natural habitat in the park.

The children's playground is built on the theme of castles with water shots, tube slides, draw bridges, climbing frames, spring boards, and apparatus to balance on.

=== Fun Rides ===
A chair lift carries the visitors to the top station of the two toboggan runs, which both have a length of 800 meters. One of them is roofed und can thus even be ridden when it is raining.

On the basement floor of the main building, designed as the Glacier World, the roller coaster Glacier Lightning and the bob run Spacerunner, the speed of which be individually adjusted, are located. Both rides operate inside und thus do not depend on weather conditions.

Outside, there is the white-water ride River Splash where boats circulate in a water channel.

== Links ==
Steinwasen-Park (English page)
