= Arsenuranospathite =

Rare mineral

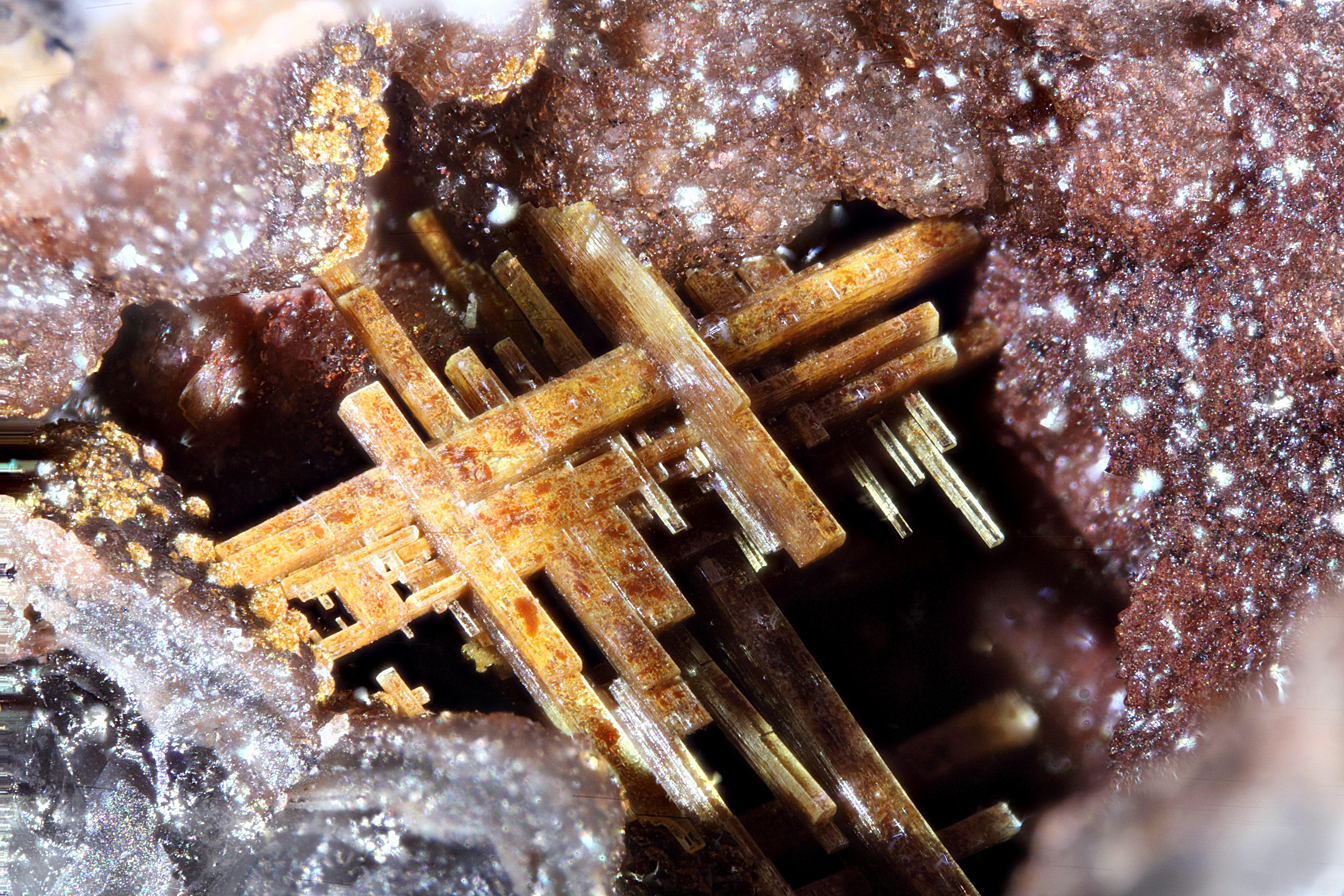
- Brown, lath-like arsenuranospathite from Grube Krunkelbach (Krunkelbach Mine), Menzenschwand, Germany

General
- Category: Minerals
- Formula: Al(UO_{2})_{2}(AsO_{4})_{2}F·20H_{2}O
- IMA symbol: Aush
- Crystal system: Orthorhombic

Identification
- Color: Pale yellow, yellowish brown
- Cleavage: Perfect on {001}; good on {100} and {010}
- Mohs scale hardness: ~2
- Streak: White

Arsenuranospathite (IMA symbol: Aush) is a rare mineral with the chemical formula Al(UO_{2})_{2}(AsO_{4})_{2}F·20H_{2}O. The name "arsenuranospathite" as arsenate analog of uranospathite was first used by Walenta (1963) with reference to a uranyl-arsenate mineral from Black Forest (Schwarzwald) massif, Germany.

Later it was undoubtedly demonstrated that the name arsenuranospathite was applied, at least, to two different species – proper arsenuranospathite, ideally Al(UO_{2})_{2}(AsO_{4})_{2}F·20H_{2}O, orthorhombic, and its partially dehydrated analogue, Al(UO_{2})_{2}(AsO_{4})_{2}F·nH_{2}O (n = 8–10), tetragonal or pseudo-tetragonal.

== Properties ==
Yellow to yellow-greenish, transparent to opaque tabular and prismatic crystals, with perfect cleavage. Transparent to translucent. Hardness = ~2. Radioactive.

== Chemical composition ==
Contents of Al and U are very stable (1±0.05 and 2±0.07 atoms per As+P+U = 4 apfu respectively). Main variations of chemical compositions are connected with the ratio As:P and the content of F.

== Occurrences ==
Sophia Mine, Böckelsbach valley, Wittichen, Schenkenzell, Black Forest, Baden-Württemberg, Germany
