= Todtnauberg =

Ortsteil in Baden-Württemberg, Germany

- Ortsteil of Todtnau
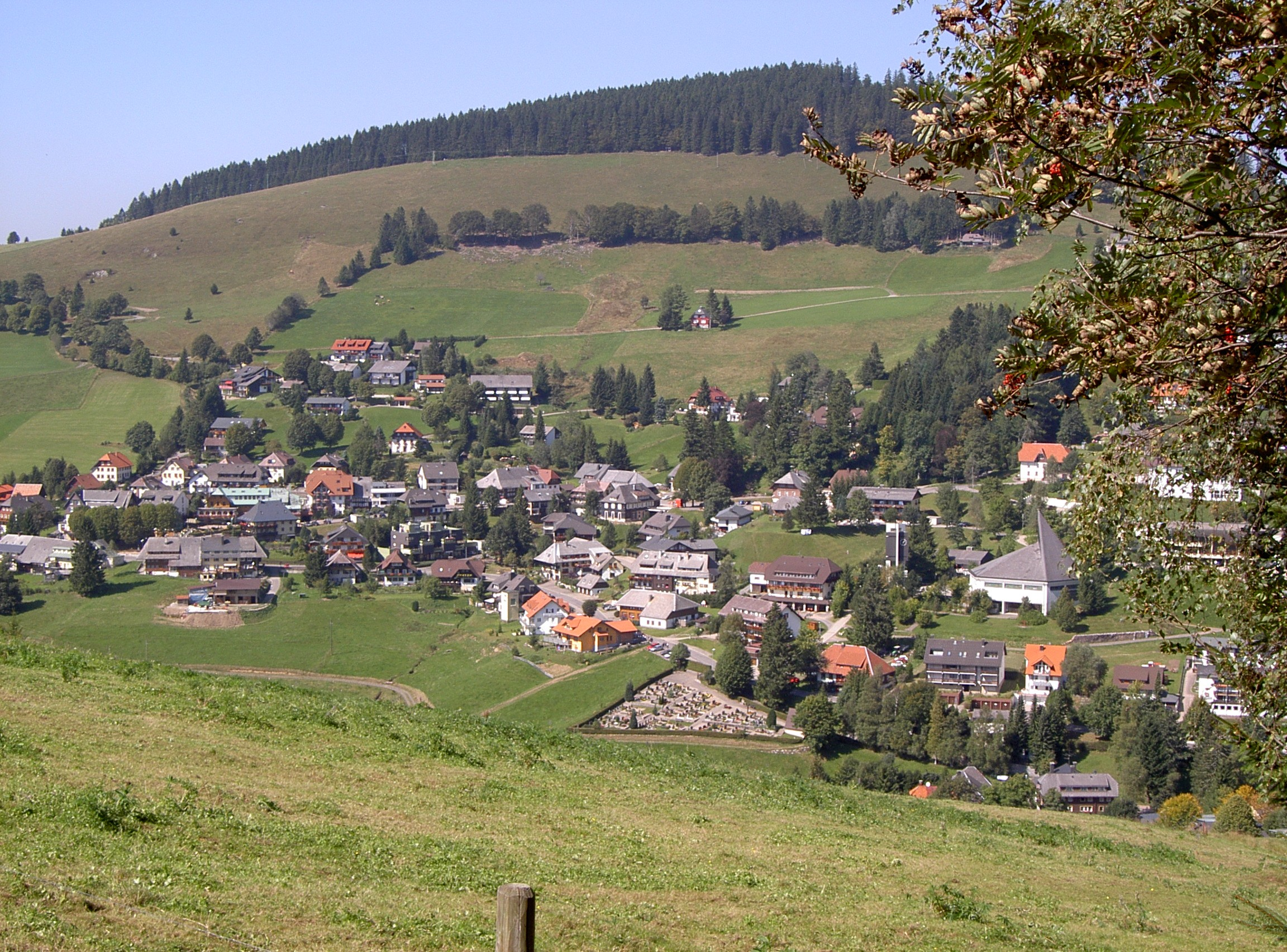
- Panoramic view

- Coat of arms
- Interactive map of Todtnauberg
- Location within Germany Location within Baden-Württemberg
- Coordinates: 47°51′5.4″N 7°56′27.24″E
- Country: Germany
- State: Baden-Württemberg
- Admin. region: Freiburg
- District: Lörrach
- Municipality: Todtnau
- Elevation: 1,150 m (3,770 ft)
- Time zone: UTC+01:00 (CET)
  - Summer (DST): UTC+02:00 (CEST)
- Postal codes: 79674
- Vehicle registration: LÖ

Todtnauberg is a German village in the Black Forest, (Schwarzwald) belonging to the municipality of Todtnau, in Baden-Württemberg. It is named after the homonymous mountain ("berg" means hill or mountain in German). It is famous because it is the place where the German philosopher Martin Heidegger had a chalet and wrote portions of his major work, Being and Time.

== History ==
The village was an autonomous municipality until it was merged into Todtnau on 1 April 1974.

== Geography ==
The village is 1,150 m (3,770 ft) amsl, 7 km (4 1/2 mi) north of Todtnau, in the northeastern corner of Lörrach District. It is a distance of 29 km (18 mi) from Freiburg, 48 km (30 mi) from Lörrach, 60 km (37 mi) from Basel, in Switzerland, and 90 km (56 mi) from Mulhouse, in France. The town is within hiking distance of Feldberg, the highest point in the Black Forest, and its open, well-sunlit valley helps sustain its popularity as a destination for skiing in the winter and hiking in the summer.

== Culture ==
Shortly after giving an interview to Der Spiegel and following Paul Celan's lecture at Freiburg, Martin Heidegger hosted Celan at his chalet at Todtnauberg in 1967. The two walked in the woods. Celan impressed Heidegger with his knowledge of botany (also evident in his poetry), and Heidegger is thought to have spoken about elements of his press interview. Celan signed Heidegger's guest book.

Celan later wrote a poem entitled "Todtnauberg" which concerned the meeting.

The chalet features in the film The Ister.

The 1992 play Totenauberg by Nobel-prize winning Austrian writer Elfriede Jelinek explores themes related to Heidegger's philosophy as well as his cultural influence. The title is a pun on the place-name "Todtnauberg", with the prefix "Toten-" alluding to the relationship between Heidegger's work and politics, and the deaths of millions ("die Toten") under Hitler's Fascist regime. Additionally, the connection between mountains and the dead is a common theme throughout Jelinek's literary work (see Die Kinder der Toten.)

In 2006, BBC Radio 4 produced a play with the title Todtnauberg, telling the story of the meeting between Celan and Heidegger, but also the story of Hannah Arendt's affair with Heidegger. John Banville wrote the play and Joss Ackland starred as Heidegger.
