= Arno Rauscher =

German politician

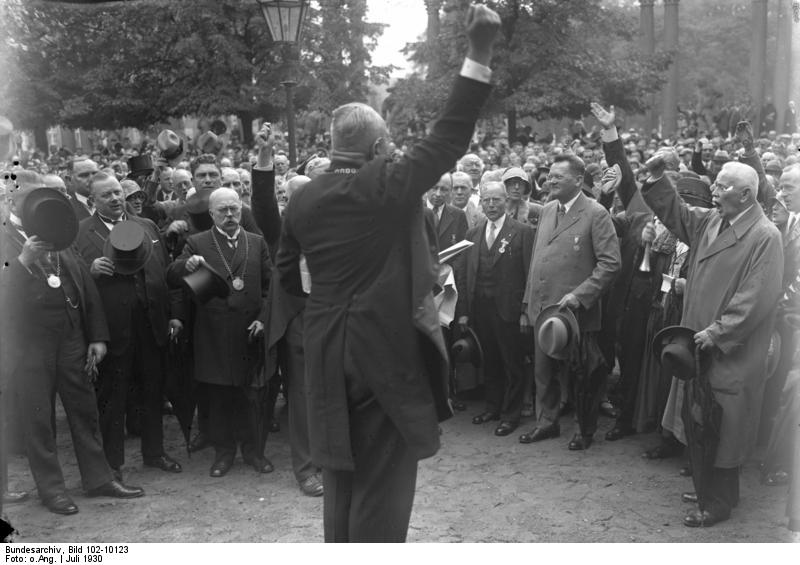
- Rauscher (centre) at a rally in Potsdam (1930)

Mayor of Potsdam
- In office 1924–1934
- Preceded by: Kurt Vosberg
- Succeeded by: Hans Friedrichs

Member of the Landtag of Prussia
- In office 1930–1933

Personal details
- Born: 17 July 1874
- Died: 15 May 1950 (aged 75)
- Resting place: Bornstedt Cemetery, Potsdam
- Party: German National People's Party (DNVP) (–1933)
- Spouse: Margarethe Thimm (1903–1940)

Arno Rauscher (17 July 1874 – 15 May 1950) was a German politician and lawyer. Between 1924 and 1934 Rauscher was mayor of Potsdam. He was also a member of the Landtag of Prussia between 1930 and 1933.

== Life ==
Rauscher was born on 17 July 1874. He married Margarethe Thimm on 19 July 1903.

Rauscher was a member of the German National People's Party (DNVP). He was an ardent German nationalist and an opponent of the Weimar Republic.

=== Landtag of Prussia ===
Rauscher was a member of the Landtag of Prussia from 30 September 1930 to April 1933. He was a noted opponent of Prussian Interior Minister Carl Severing. In particular, he clashed with Severing over the flag dispute. The dispute began when Adolf Hitler decreed, on 12 March 1933, that the black-red-gold flag of Weimar Republic would be replaced by two co-official national flags: the black-white-red tricolour of the former German Empire and the swastika flag. Severing in his role as Interior Minister of Prussia refused to fly the swastika flag.

=== Mayor of Potsdam ===
In November 1913 he was elected deputy mayor of Potsdam.

Rauscher was mayor of Potsdam between April 1924 and March 1934. Prior to being elected mayor, he was chairman of the Potsdam Art Association. Rauscher succeeded Kurt Vosberg as mayor. Vosberg had resigned due to his divorce, which had damaged his credibility in conservative political circles.

As mayor Rauscher hosted an official visit from Adolf Hitler and Paul von Hindenburg, just shortly after Hitler and the Nazi Party had seized power in 1933. During this visit both Hitler and von Hindenburg were made honorary citizens of Potsdam.

In June 1933, the Nazi Party was declared the only legal political party in Germany, forcing the dissolution of the German National People's Party (DNVP). As a result, Rauscher was rendered an independent politician. Despite his status as a fellow traveler of the Nazi Party; Rauscher would eventually be forced out of office in early 1934 although his term of office was not due to end until 1936. He was placed under considerable pressure by the Nazi-controlled regional government. Rauscher declared a leave of absence in January 1934; later resigning in March that year. He was replaced by the Nazi Hans Friedrichs.

Rauscher's ouster was a notable political event. It demonstrated that the Nazi government would no longer permit non-Nazis to hold any elected office in Germany, even at the municipal level. Despite the fact that Rauscher generally supported the aims of the Nazi Party and was democratically elected, he was not immune to the monopolization of political power by the Nazis.

Rauscher died on 15 May 1950. He was buried in the Bornstedt Cemetery in Potsdam alongside his wife Margarethe who had died on 2 December 1940.
