= Menzenschwand =

- Village of St. Blasien
- Coat of arms
- Interactive map of Menzenschwand
- Location within Germany Location within Baden-Württemberg
- Coordinates: 47°49′4″N 8°4′14″E
- Country: Germany
- State: Baden-Württemberg
- Town: St. Blasien
- Elevation: 863 m (2,831 ft)

Population (2020)
  - Total: 526
- Time zone: UTC+01:00 (CET)
  - Summer (DST): UTC+02:00 (CEST)
- Postal codes: 79837
- Dialling codes: 07675

Menzenschwand (Alemannic: Menzèschwand) is a climatic health spa in the Black Forest in Germany. The village lies within the borough of St. Blasien in the state of Baden-Württemberg.

== Geography ==
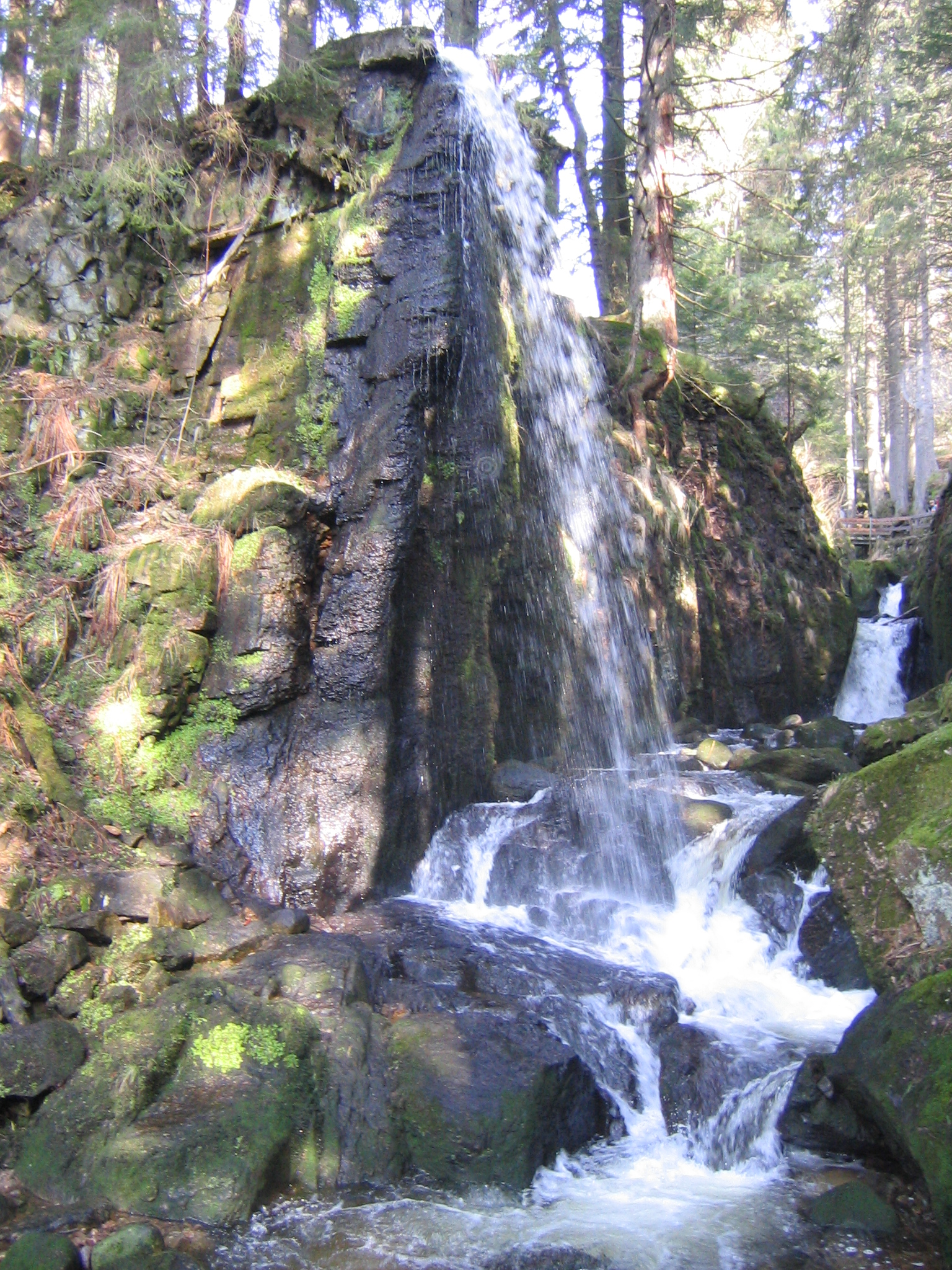
Waterfalls in the gorge of the Menzenschwander Alb

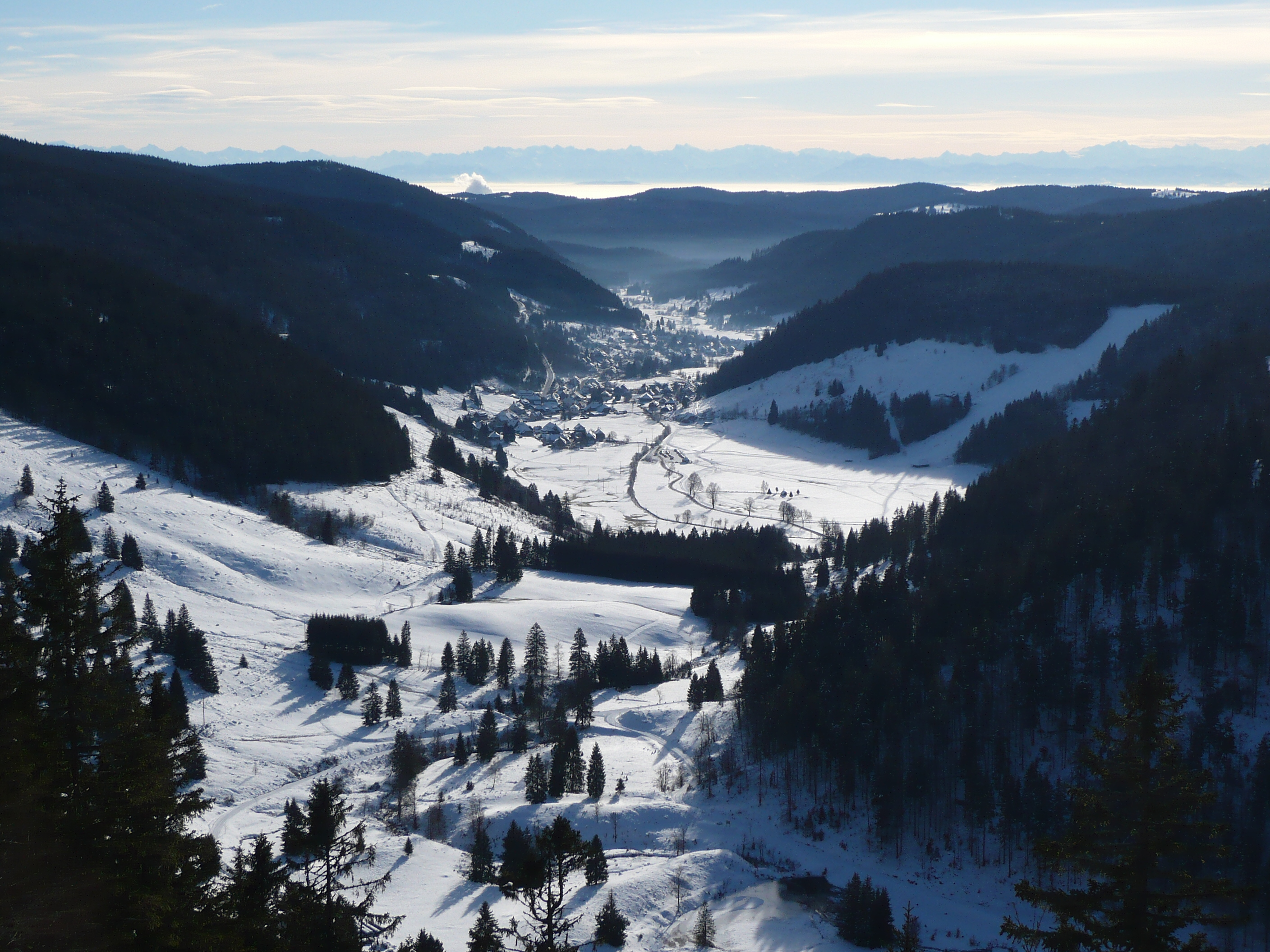
Upper Alb valley with the terminal moraine of Kluse (front), terrace to the Krunkelbach valley bottom (centre) and Hinterdorf

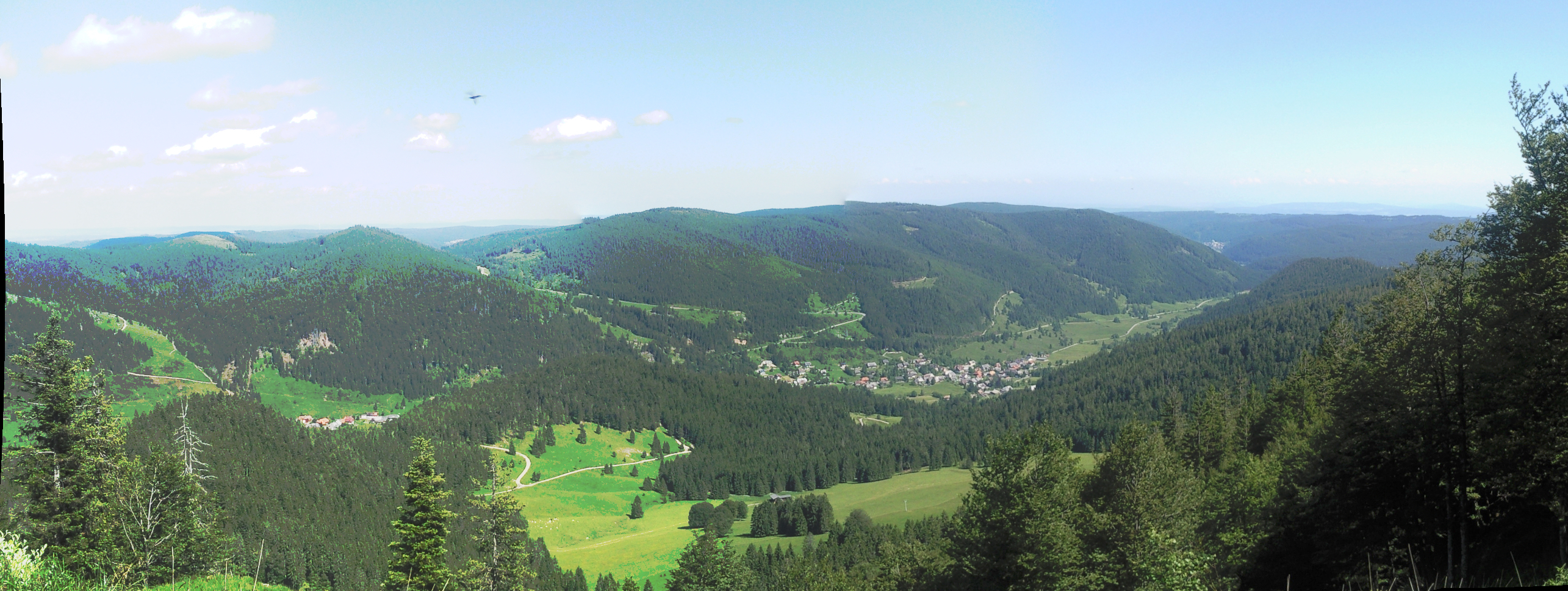
View from Spießhorn into the valley of the Menzenschwander Alb. Left the Hinterdorf; right: the Vorderdorf

Menzenschwand comprises three villages, Vorderdorf ("front village"), Mitteldorf ("middle village") and Hinterdorf ("rear village"), has a population of just under 550 inhabitants and belongs to the borough of St. Blasien. It lies in the valley of Menzenschwander Alb which runs south from the 1,493-metre-high Feldberg. The valley joins the westward-running valley of the Bernauer Alb above St. Blasien. In the valley to the east lies the lake of Schluchsee.

The valley landscape of Menzenschwand is shaped by the glacial streams of the Feldberg Glacier from several ice ages. The main glacier, which was up to 300 metres thick, carved out trough-shaped valley of the Krunkelbach that starts at the large cwm west of the Herzogenhorn. The Alb valley to the south joins the Krunkelbach valley at a small valley step about 20 metres high. The Alb has a gorge there with small waterfalls, one of them manmade. A little higher up, a prominent end moraine embankment crosses the valley. The narrow water gap of the stream, the Menzenschwand splash dam reservoir (Menzenschwander Kluse), was previously used to store water for log rafting. The basin-shaped mouth area is a sedimented, former lake. Numerous roches moutonnée characterise the meadows of the lower slopes.

To the west of the Hinterdorf, in a cym below the Spießhorn (1348.9 metres), lies the circular Scheibenlechtenmoos, a raised mountain bog. Valuable small bogs of various stages of development can also be found in the summit area of the Bärhalde north.

Large parts of the district belong to the Feldberg Nature Reserve.

=== Sights ===
- Several ensembles of well preserved Black Forest houses in the village
- Feldberg summit area
- Herzogenhorn summit area
- Wildlife of the steep alpine mountainsides (including chamois and birds of prey)
- Gorge and waterfalls of the Menzenschwander Alb below the Menzenschwander Kluse (see also Waterfalls of Germany)
- Raised bog of Scheibenlechtenmoos in a cirque below the Spießhorn
- Le Petit Salon and its Winterhalter exhibition

== Trivia ==
During the Cold War the Krunkelbach Pit was the only active uranium mine in West Germany. At the same time, East Germany was one of the world's largest uranium producers through SDAG Wismut.

== Literature ==
- Frank Bode: Subrezenter Vegetations- und Landschaftswandel im Südschwarzwald. Untersucht am Beispiel des Menzenschwander Tals. Dissertation, University of Freiburg, 2005, urn:nbn:de:bsz:25-opus-26477
- Hubert Mayer, Michael Ehlert (2000), Chronik Menzenschwand. Geschichte eines Schwarzwalddorfes (in German), St. Blasien: Stadtverwaltung, ISBN 3-00-007141-5
- Armin Simon (2003), "Der Streit um das Schwarzwald-Uran. Die Auseinandersetzung um den Uranbergbau in Menzenschwand im Südschwarzwald 1960–1991", in Arbeitskreis Regionalgeschichte Freiburg e.V. (ed.), Alltag & Provinz (in German), vol. 11, Bremgarten: Donzelli-Kluckert Verlag, ISBN 3-933284-11-2
