= Spießhorn =

Mountain in Germany

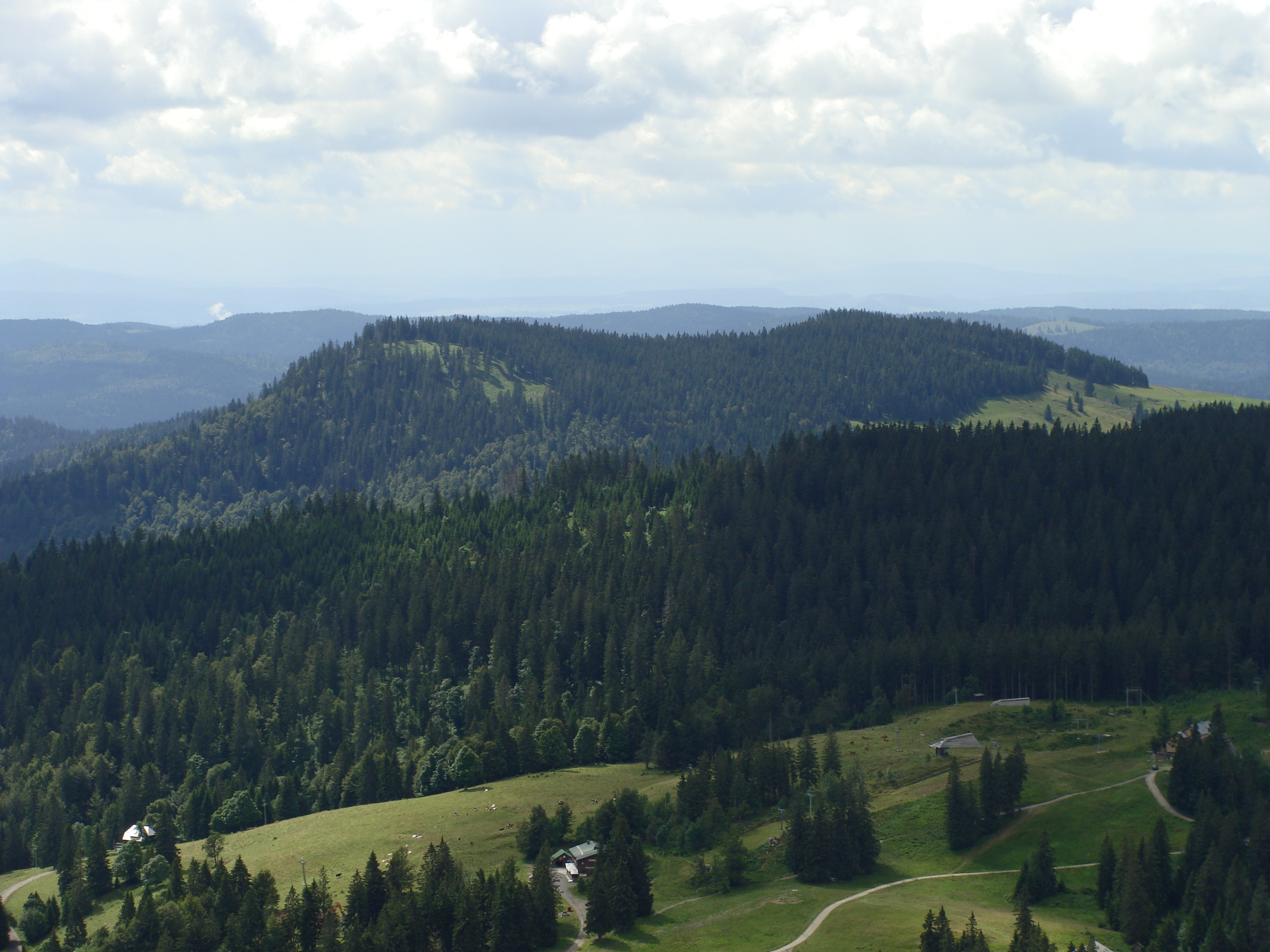
- The Spießhorn seen from Seebuck. The right hand summit is part of the Kleiner Spießhorn

Highest point
- Elevation: 1,348.9 m above sea level (NHN) (4,426 ft)
- Coordinates: 47°49′50″N 8°02′29″E

Geography
- Location within Baden-Württemberg
- Location: Baden-Württemberg
- Parent range: Black Forest

The Spießhorn is a mountain, 1,348.9 m above NHN high, in the Black Forest just east of the Herzogenhorn. The summit is on the boundary between St. Blasien and Bernau im Schwarzwald. The Spießhorn is largely forested. At the summit is an observation pavilion. To the southwest is a subpeak, the Kleines Spießhorn.
