= Todtnau =

- Town
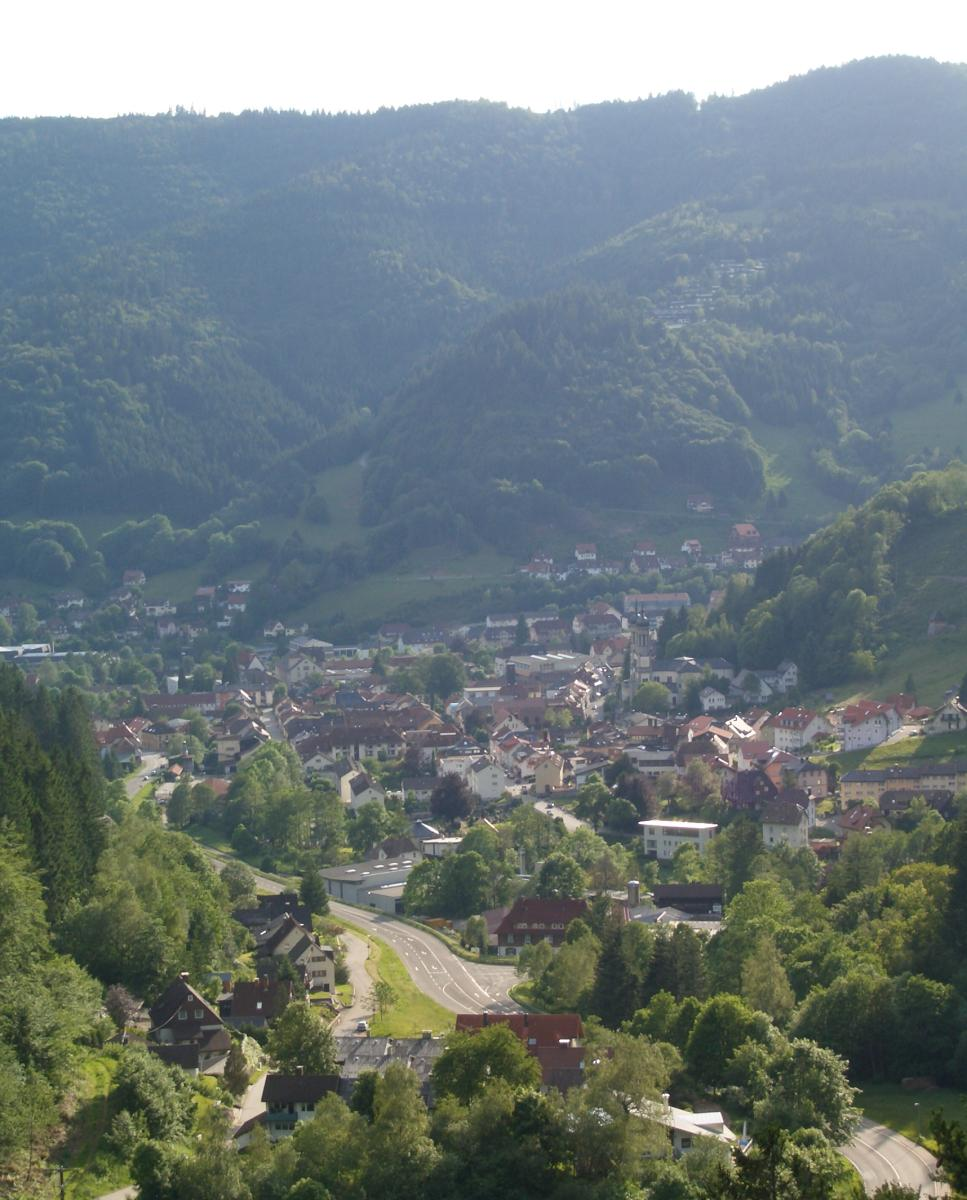
- 2005 panoramic view

- Coat of arms

- Location of Todtnau in Lörrach District
- Interactive map of Todtnau
- Location within Germany Location within Baden-Württemberg
- Coordinates: 47°50′N 07°57′E
- Country: Germany
- State: Baden-Württemberg
- Admin. region: Freiburg
- District: Lörrach

Government
  - Mayor (2023–31): Oliver Fiedel

Area
  - Total: 69.75 km^{2} (26.93 sq mi)
- Elevation: 659 m (2,162 ft)

Population (2025-12-31)
  - Total: 4,992
  - Density: 71.57/km^{2} (185.4/sq mi)
- Time zone: UTC+01:00 (CET)
  - Summer (DST): UTC+02:00 (CEST)
- Postal codes: 79674
- Dialling codes: 07671
- Vehicle registration: LÖ
- Website: Official website

Todtnau (German pronunciation: [ˈtɔtnaʊ]) is a town in the district of Lörrach in Baden-Württemberg, Germany. As of 2009 its population was of 4,932.

== Geography ==
It is situated in the Black Forest, on the river Wiese, 20 km southeast of Freiburg.

The municipality counts 8 civil parishes (Ortsteil):

- Aftersteg
- Brandenberg
- Geschwend
- Herrenschwand
- Muggenbrunn
- Präg
- Schlechtnau
- Todtnauberg

== Personalities ==
- Karl Nessler, inventor of the permanent wave was born here.
- Martin Heidegger had a chalet in Todtnauberg

== Photogallery ==
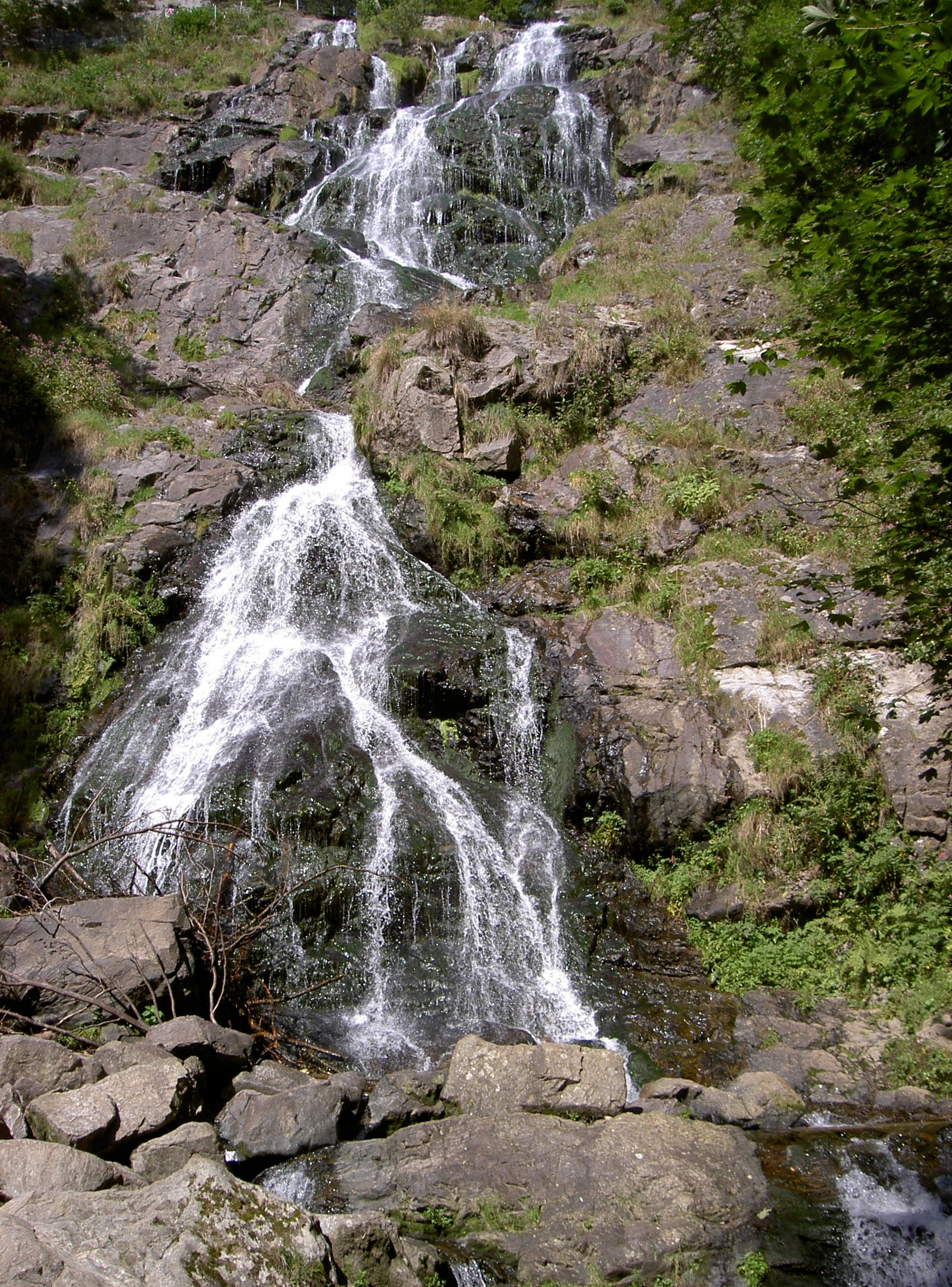
Todtnau waterfall

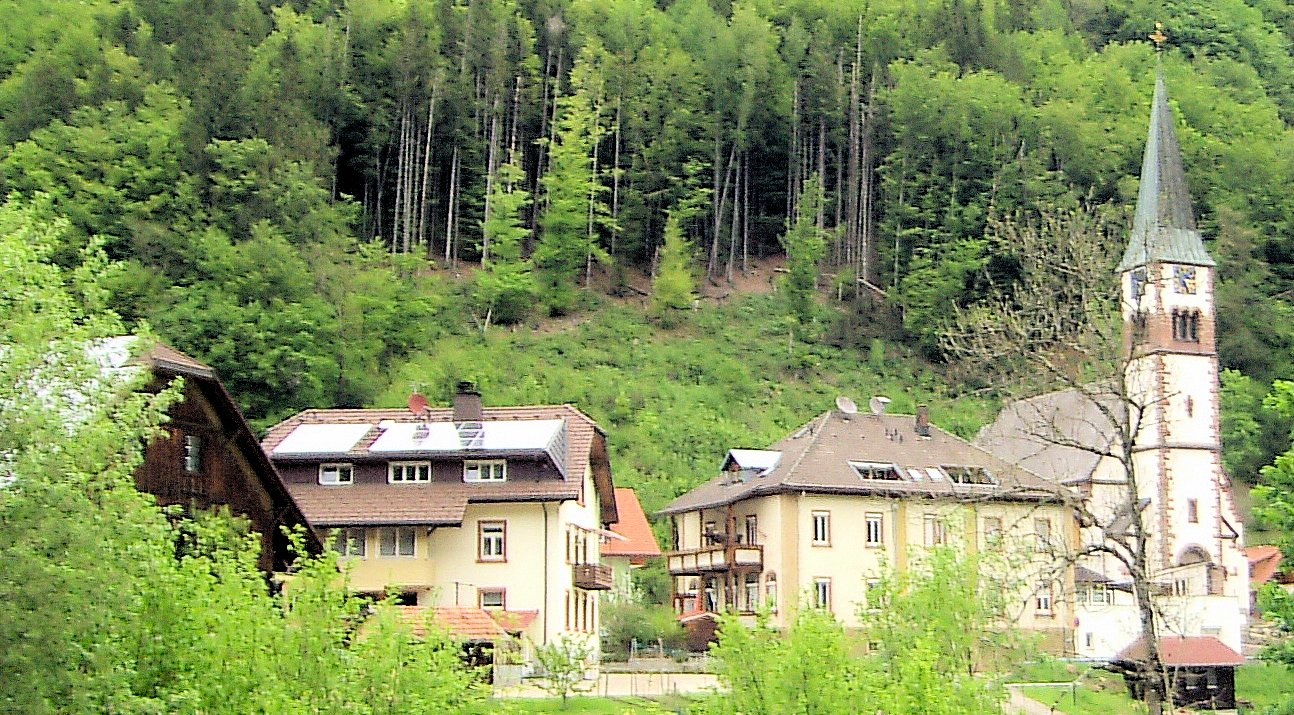
The church of Geschwend

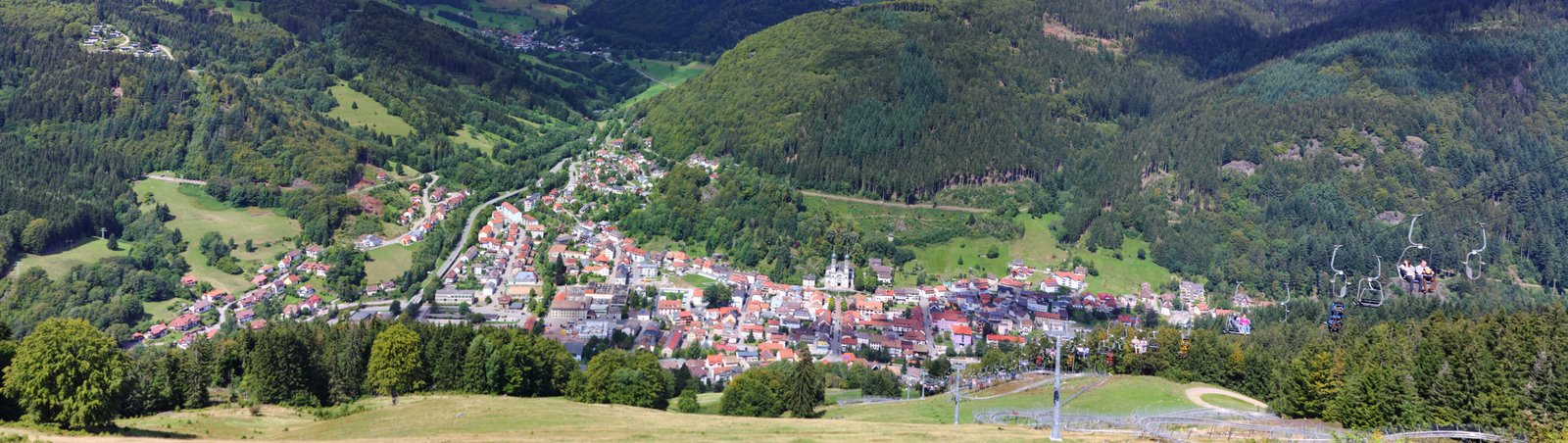
Panoramic view of Todtnau
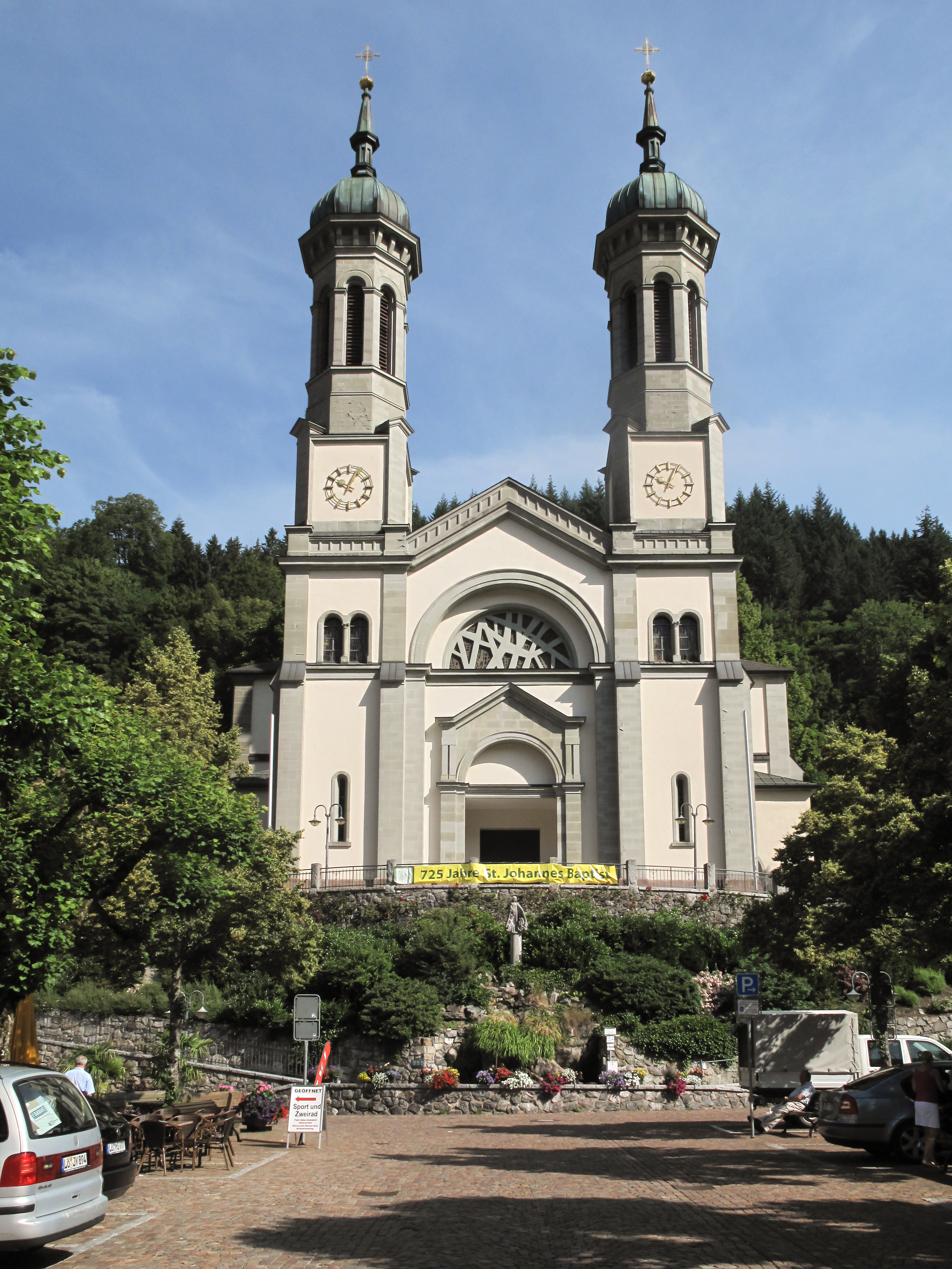
Todtnau, church: die Sankt Johannes der Täuferkirche

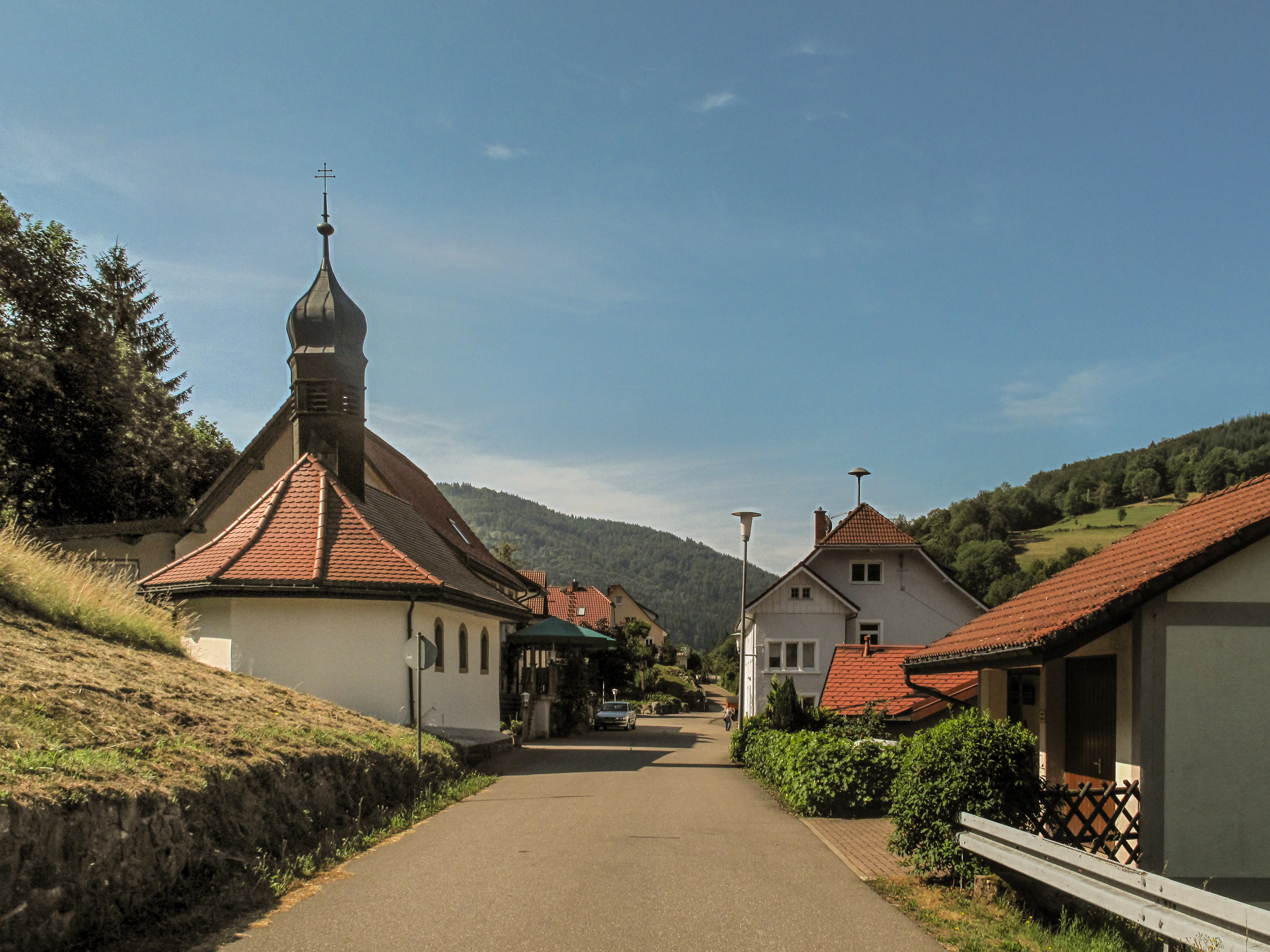
Schlechtnau, chapel in the street

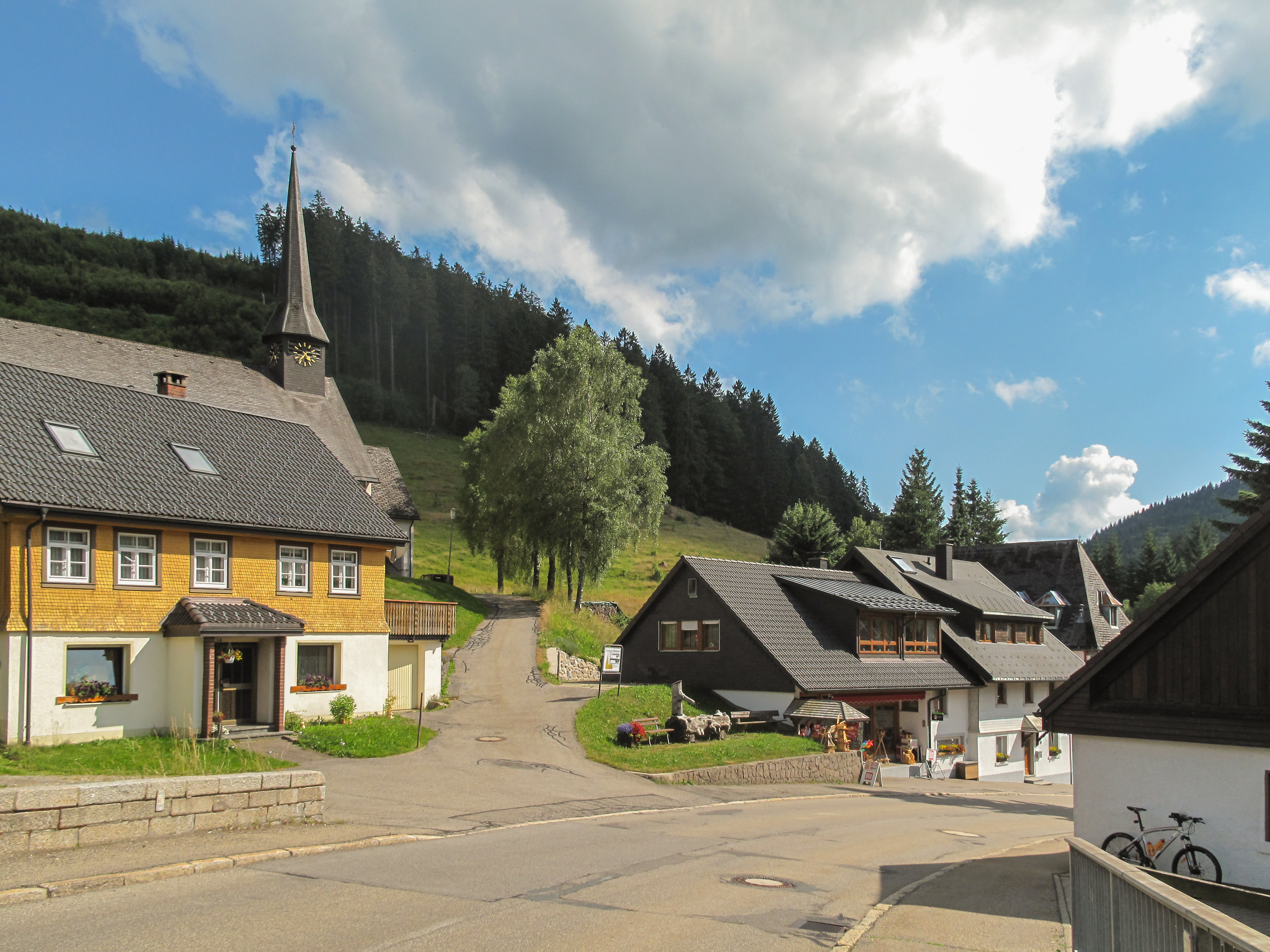
Muggenbrunn, church (die Sankt Cornelius Kirche) in the street

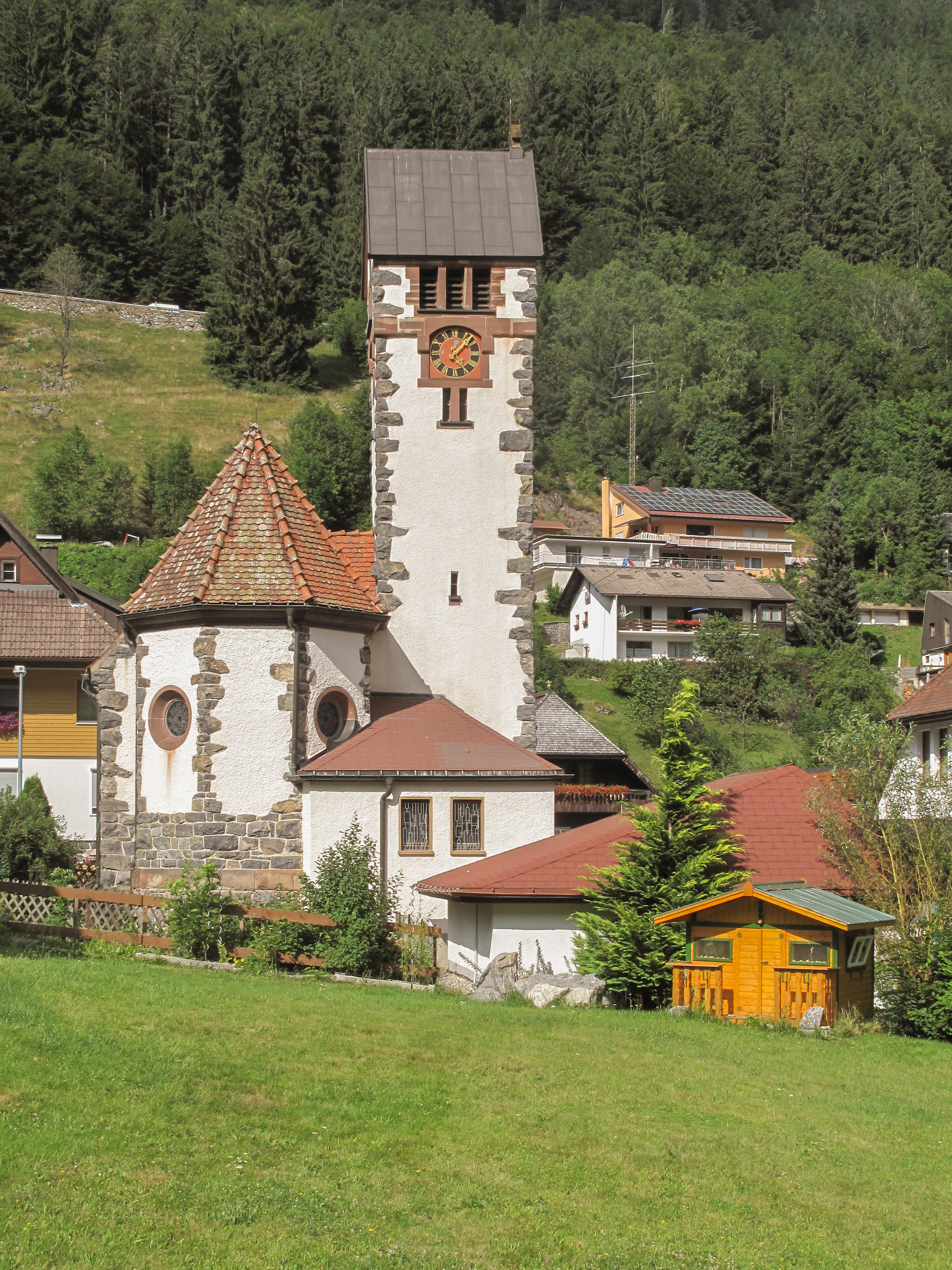
Aftersteg, church: die Sankt Anna Kirche
