= Zastler Hut =

Coordinates: 47°52′47″N 8°0′26.8″E

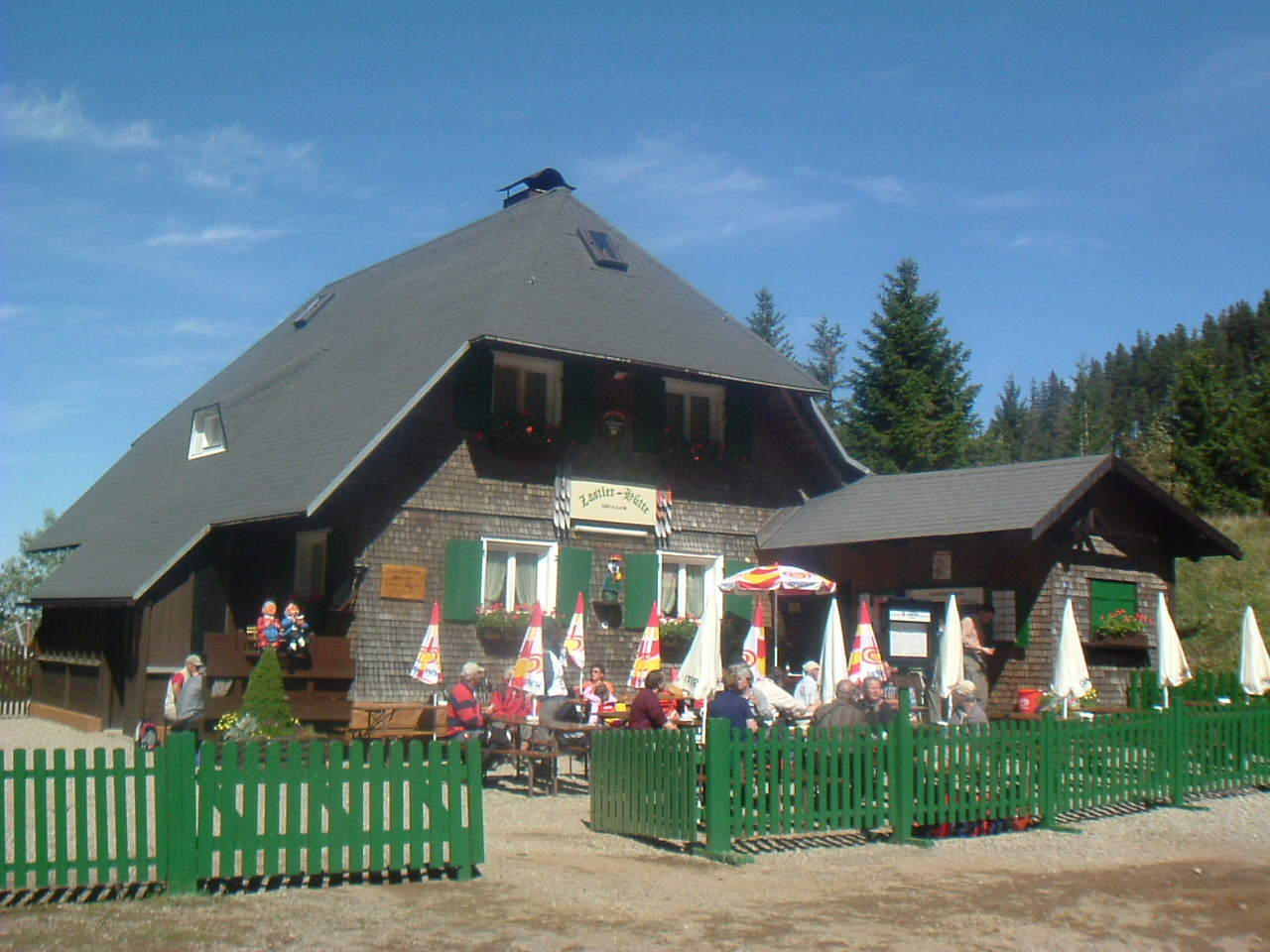
The Zastler Hut

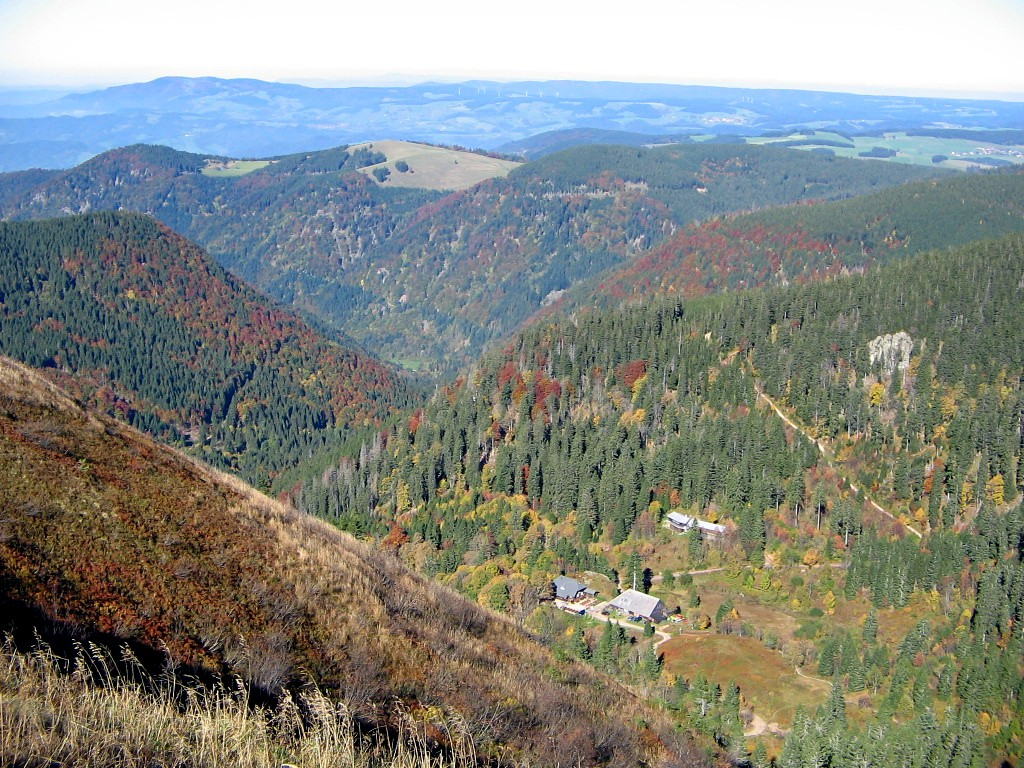
View of the hut and the Zastler valley from the Feldberg (behind is the Hinterwaldkopf and on the horizon the Kandel)

The Zastler Hut (German: Zastler Hütte) is a managed mountain hut situated at a height of 1,256 m above NHN in the Black Forest in Germany. It is located in the Zastler Loch northwest of the Feldberg summit, the highest peak in the Black Forest and state of Baden-Württemberg.

== Location ==
The Zastler Hut stands in the middle of the Feldberg Nature Reserve below an ice age cirque and below the summit of the Feldberg. Immediately next to a nature trail, it is a popular starting point and destination for walks in the Feldberg region.

== History ==
The Zastler cattle hut was formerly owned by the parish of Zastler, but was taken over by the state in the early 20th century along with the farms in the Zastler valley. Since 1951 and 1962 it became once again the property of the then independent parish of Zastler which now belongs to the municipality of Oberried. Since 2001 the hut has been privately owned. In 1883 the herdsman's residence and cattle shed were demolished and a new, larger cattle hut with herdsman's quarters and farming rights was built. In the following years the hut was frequently visited by artists and naturalists from Freiburg, as well as walkers and skiers to whom it was rented in winter. The hut used to be supplied with water from the Zastlerbach. In 1954 three springs were impounded on the Osterrain in order to supply the nearby Freiburger Hut of the Ski-Club Freiburg and the Zastler Hut with drinking water, which was then connected in 1956. Since 1963 both huts have had electricity.

After the cattle hut burned down on 12 February 1910, it was rebuilt by the Kirchzarten Forestry Office. The new, larger hut was opened on 12 June 1912. In February 1942 the cattle hut was partially collapsed by an avalanche and became increasingly dilapidated in the years that followed, until it was rebuilt in the early post-war period.

In December 2011 the Zastler Hut was cut off from the outside world for six days by a rockslide.

== Access ==
During the hut open season (mid May to end October) overnight accommodation is available in a mattress room. The hut is only accessible on foot, the nearest car parks are on the Rinken (approach from Hinterzarten), on the Feldberg, near the Erlenbacher Hut and the Stollenbacher Hut and in the valley head of the Zastlertal valley.
