= Historical Archive with Rhenish Picture Archive =

Municipal archive of Cologne, Germany

Historisches Archiv mit Rheinischem Bildarchiv
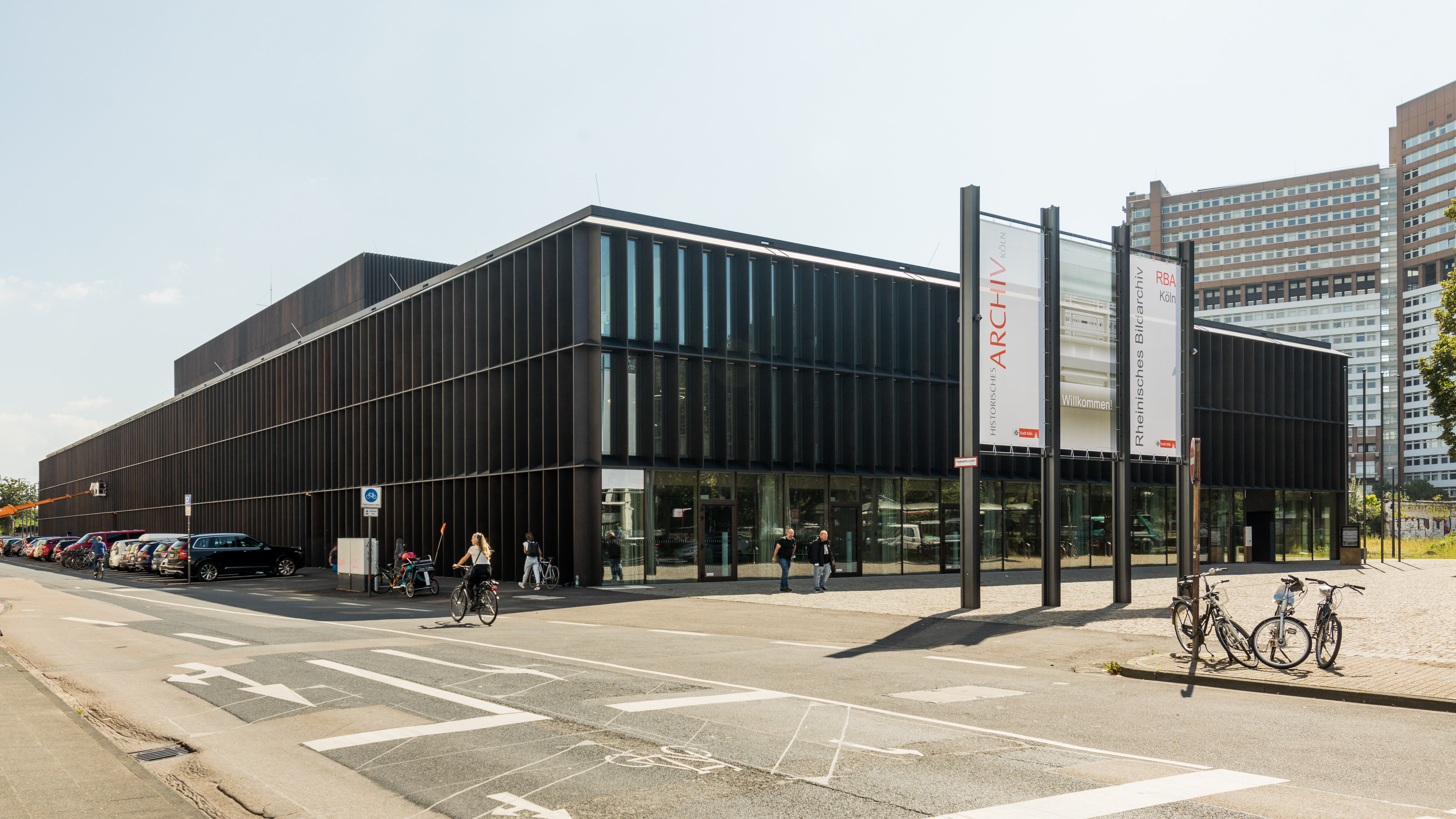
- Archive administration and reading room of the archive in Cologne
- Established: 14th century
- Location: Cologne (Köln), Germany
- Coordinates: 50°55′28″N 6°56′15″E
- Type: Archive
- Director: Ulrich Fischer
- Website: historischesarchivkoeln.de

The Historical Archive with Rhenish Picture Archive (German: Historisches Archiv mit Rheinischem Bildarchiv; until January 2023, Historical Archive of the City of Cologne: German: Historisches Archiv der Stadt Köln, or Kölner Stadtarchiv for short) is the municipal archive of Cologne, Germany. It ranks among the largest communal archives in Europe.

A municipal archive has existed in Cologne since the Middle Ages. The oldest inventory of charters in the archive is dated 1408–1409. The oldest document kept in the archive is a charter dated 922 CE.

The archive contains official records and private documents from all ages of Cologne history, as well as an extensive library of manuscripts. While the adjective historical in its name might suggest a closed, complete archive with a focus on older history, the archive is also the official government repository responsible for collecting recent municipal records.

The six-storey archive building collapsed on 3 March 2009, along with two neighbouring apartment buildings. Two residents of these buildings were found dead. All archive staff and visitors survived, as they were able to escape upon a warning by construction workers. Around 90% of archival records were buried by the collapse, although it subsequently proved possible to rescue and repair many of them.

Construction work on a new archive began in 2014, and the new archive opened on 3 September 2021. At that time, a spokesperson for the archive estimated that restoration work will require more than 200 persons to work continuously for thirty years.

In January 2023, the archive merged with the Rhenish Picture Archive (German: Rheinisches Bildarchiv), a collection of photographs on the history of art, architecture, culture, and photography in Cologne and the Rhineland, now housed in the same building: from this date the joint institution adopted its current name.

== Legal basis ==
The work of communal archives in the state of North Rhine-Westphalia is based on the Archivgesetz des Landes NRW bill of 1989. The municipal archive of Cologne is also governed by the municipal archive ordinance Archivsatzung, last revised in 2007. The federal Bundesarchivgesetz bill does not apply.

== History ==
=== Shrine system ===
An early programme of holding archival records in Cologne was the so-called shrine system (Schreinswesen), used for documenting citizens' rights. A shrine (Schrein, from Latin: scrinium) was a wooden chest or cabinet where parish administrations stored records and charters. Such shrines were used for records storage throughout the Middle Ages and into early modern times, most notably in the parish of St. Lawrence near the Cologne town hall. The records were for the most part those of real estate transactions: these were recorded on sheets of parchment or in books, which subsequently became known as shrine books (Schreinsbücher). In Cologne, these books can be traced back to 1130 CE. Similar books from the late 12th century are known from the cities of Metz and Andernach. In the 19th century, all records of the old Cologne shrine quarters were transferred to the municipal archives.

=== Early history ===
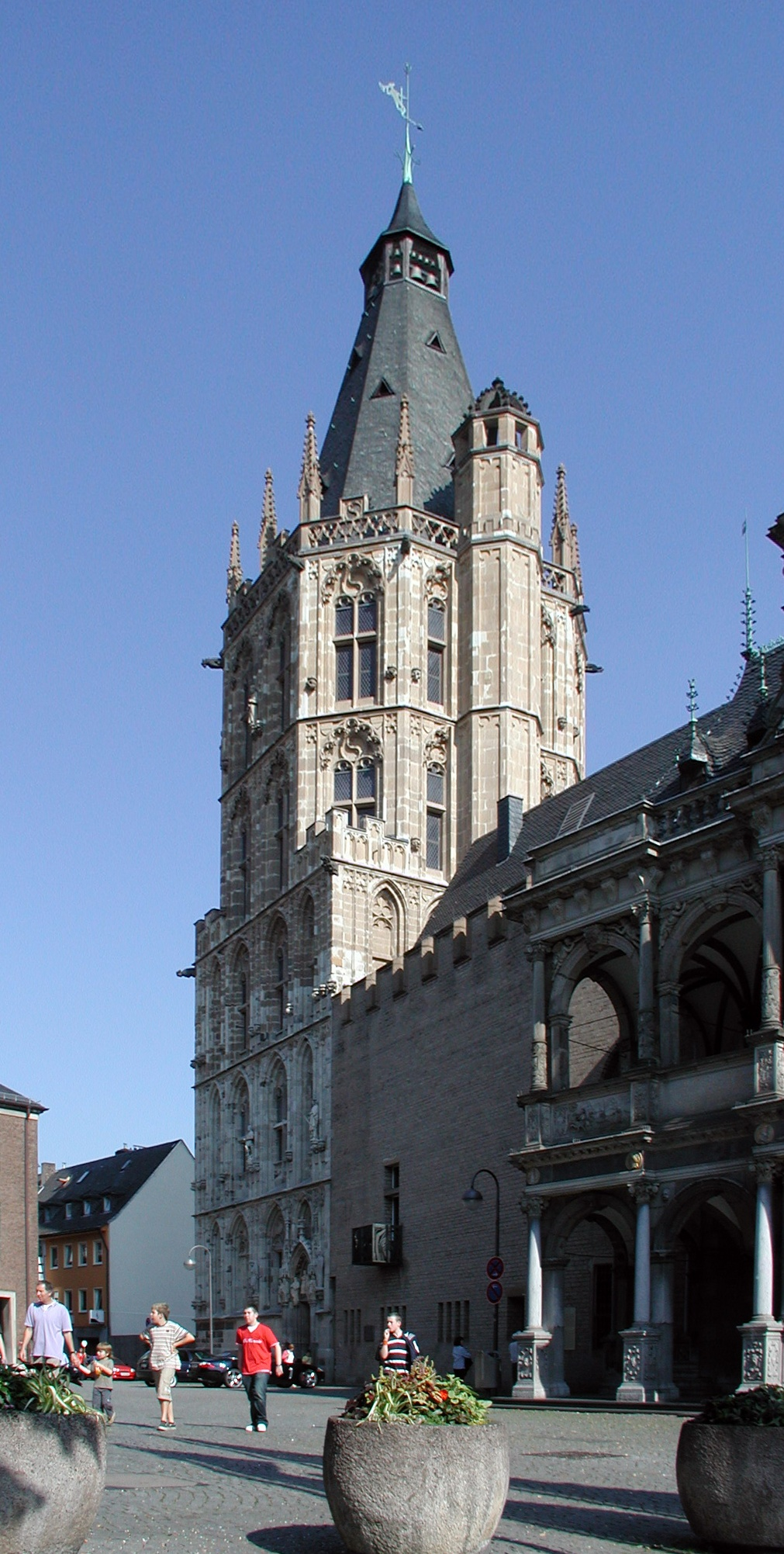
Cologne City Hall tower, 2007

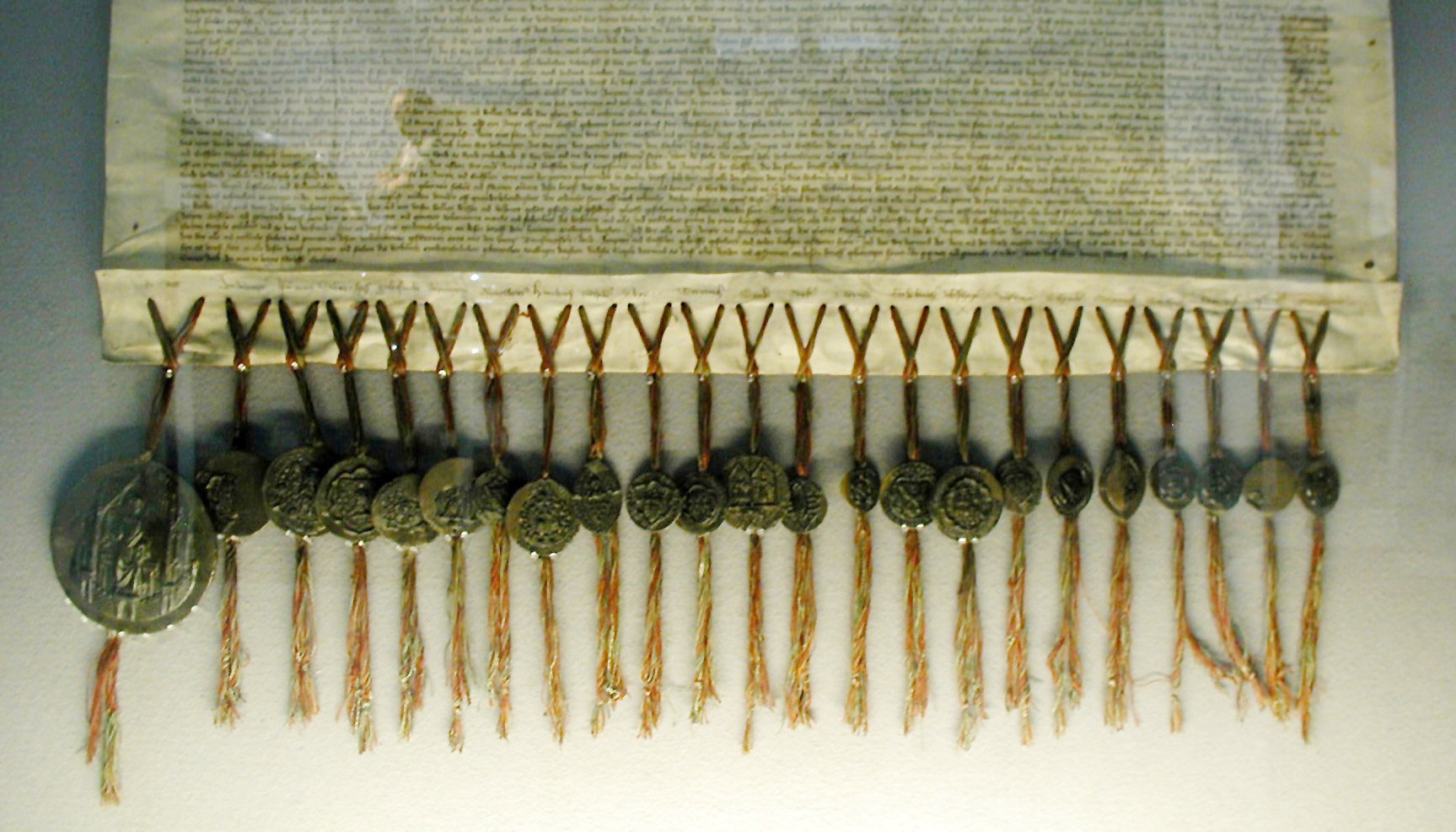
Detail from the Kölner Verbundbrief charter

Important documents relating to the city of Cologne and its citizens have been archived since the Middle Ages. As late as 1322, these could still be stored in a single chest in the home of a patrician. In 1326 the city council decided to compile the so-called "White Book" (Weißes Buch), a finding aid comprising copies of charters and privileges. By 1370 the archives were located in the Haus zur Stessen.

As the city and its national and international trade thrived and prospered, the municipal administration began to plan further storage to house the growing number of documents in an adequate space. On 19 August 1406, the city council resolved to add a tower to the town hall. The tower was built between 1407 and 1414, and served, among other purposes, as a storage room for municipal charters, privileges, and securities. Cologne's bursary officer, Roland von Odendorp, was responsible for its construction. The Gothic building with its two tetragonal upper stories and two more octagonal top stories has some similarities to Dutch belfries of the time and rises to 61 metres (200 ft). It contained a wine cellar, an armory, a meeting room for the municipal council, a firefighter guardroom on the very top, and a vaulted room for the municipal archives. Documents were stored in chests or cabinets marked A to X. The Kölner Verbundbrief charter, a municipal constitution document of 1396, was granted pride of place in a chest decorated with a crown. After 1414, the archive was directed by a vault master (Gewulvemeister). Its management was later taken over by a committee of municipal jurists, the syndici.

In 1594, the records of the Bruges offices of the Hanseatic League (then stored in Antwerp) were transferred to the Cologne archives. These records included copies of the protocols of the diets of the Hanseatic League. With the 1594 transfer, the Cologne archive became the most important repository of historical material concerning the Hanseatic League and thus concerning the history of Northern Germany in general, matched only by the municipal archives of Lübeck.

On 27 February 1602, the city council ordered that books on jurisdiction and administration were to be systematically bought at the regularly held Frankfurt Book Fair. These were subsequently stored in the municipal archive and became the basis of the Cologne municipal library.

After the secularization of abbeys and colleges of canons in Cologne in the early years of the 19th century, the French government ordered their archives to be stored in the state archives in Düsseldorf. It was not until 1949 that a mayor of Cologne succeeded in recovering 19,000 charters and many other records for the Cologne municipal archives.

=== Acquisitions in the 19th century ===
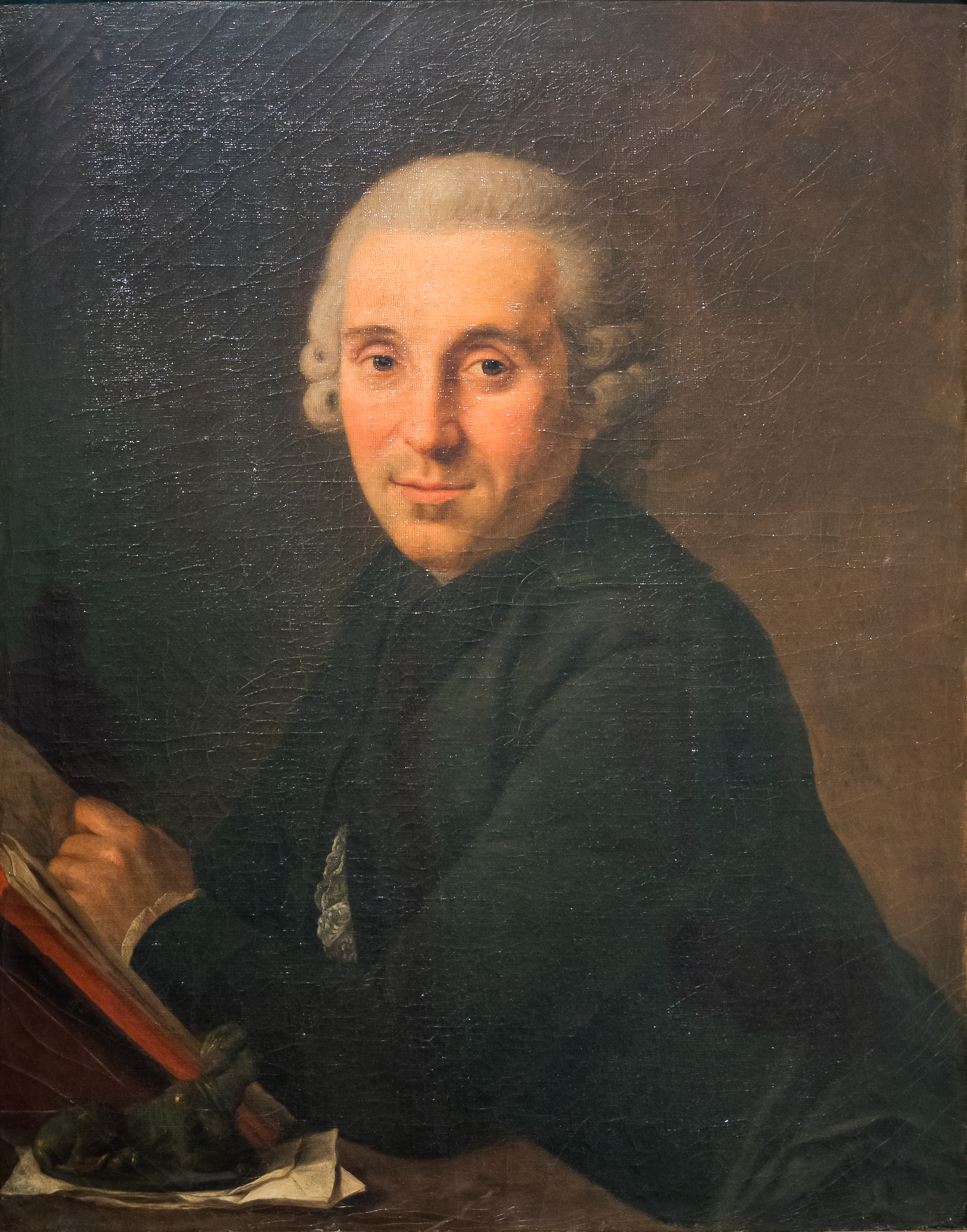
Ferdinand Franz Wallraf, collector, portrait by Johann Anton de Peters

In 1818, the city of Cologne was bequeathed Ferdinand Franz Wallraf's major collection of art, books, and manuscripts. After Wallraf's death in 1824, his collection of statues and paintings became the basis of the Wallrafianum, now known as the Wallraf-Richartz Museum, one of Cologne's major art museums. The archive and library, at that time still run as a single entity, were chosen to hold all books and manuscripts. When the institutions were administratively separated in the 1880s, all manuscripts were retained by the archive, while all printed books were given to the library. This is why, unlike many other archives, the Cologne archive boasts a major collection of medieval manuscripts. Both archive and library shared a building until 1934, when the library moved to the newly built building of the University of Cologne.

From 1815 until he died in 1857, Johann Jakob Peter Fuchs managed the municipal archive as its honorary director. Fuchs was a friend of Wallraf's who also supervised the incorporation and cataloging of the Wallraf collection in 1824. He reorganized the entire archive and made its contents accessible to scholarly research.

In 1857, Leonhard Ennen became the first full-time municipal archivist. Among other material, he acquired documents from the estate of Hermann von Weinsberg, a 16th-century Cologne jurist famous for his autobiographical writings.

=== Archive building of 1897 ===
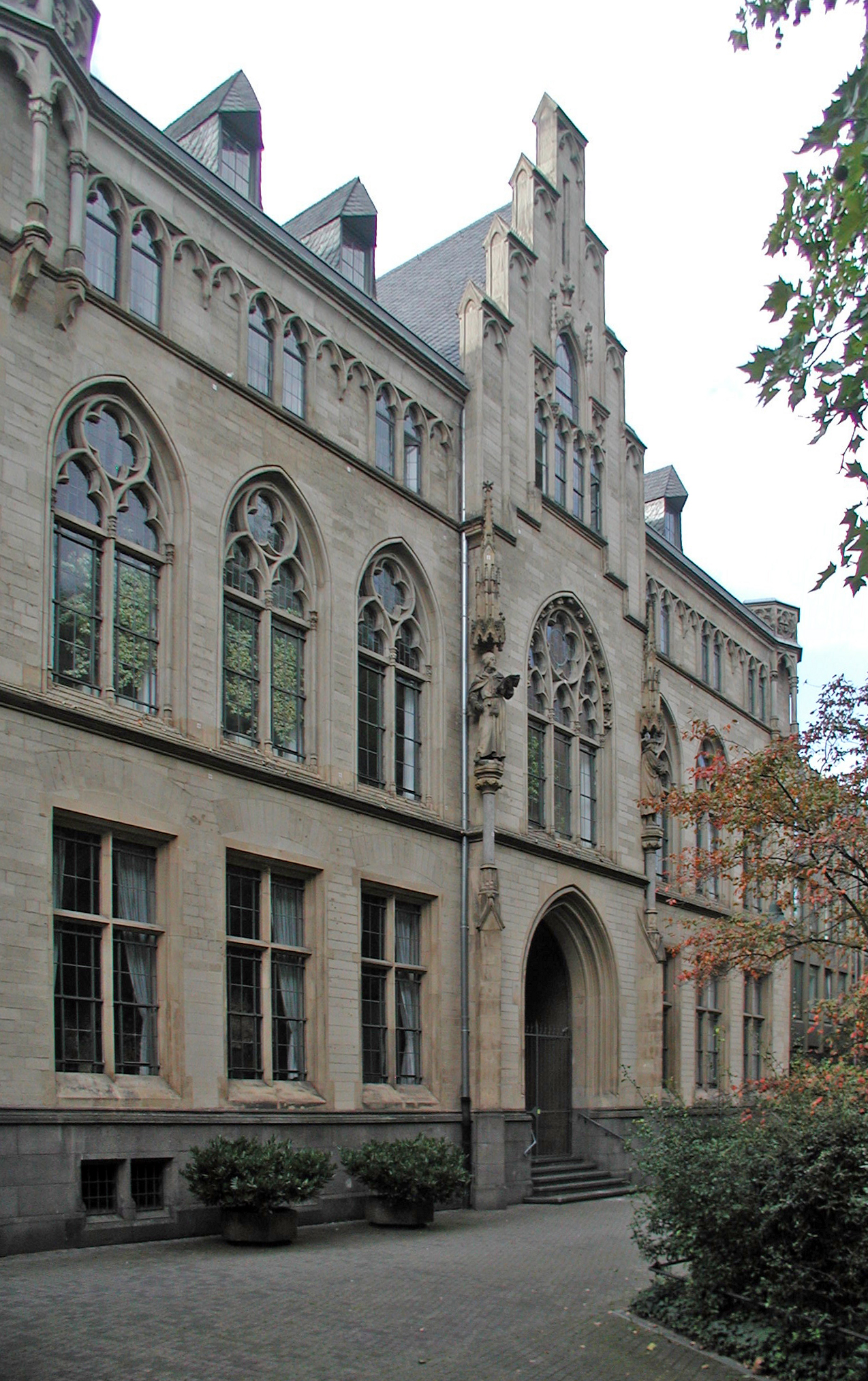
City archive (Stadtarchiv) building of 1897, situated at Gereonskloster 12 in Cologne

A new purpose-built structure to house the municipal archive and library was erected between 1894 and 1897 to a Gothic revival design by Friedrich Carl Heimann; it was inaugurated in December 1897. The new building was large enough to accommodate the archive at a time of accelerated growth when the city of Cologne was absorbing many previously independent towns and villages.

During World War II the building suffered damage from bombing. However, since all records and manuscripts had been moved into secure storage as early as September 1939, the archive did not suffer any substantial loss.

After the archive moved to its new location in 1971, the 1897 building has been used as a private library by Gerling, a large insurance company.

=== Archive building of 1971 ===
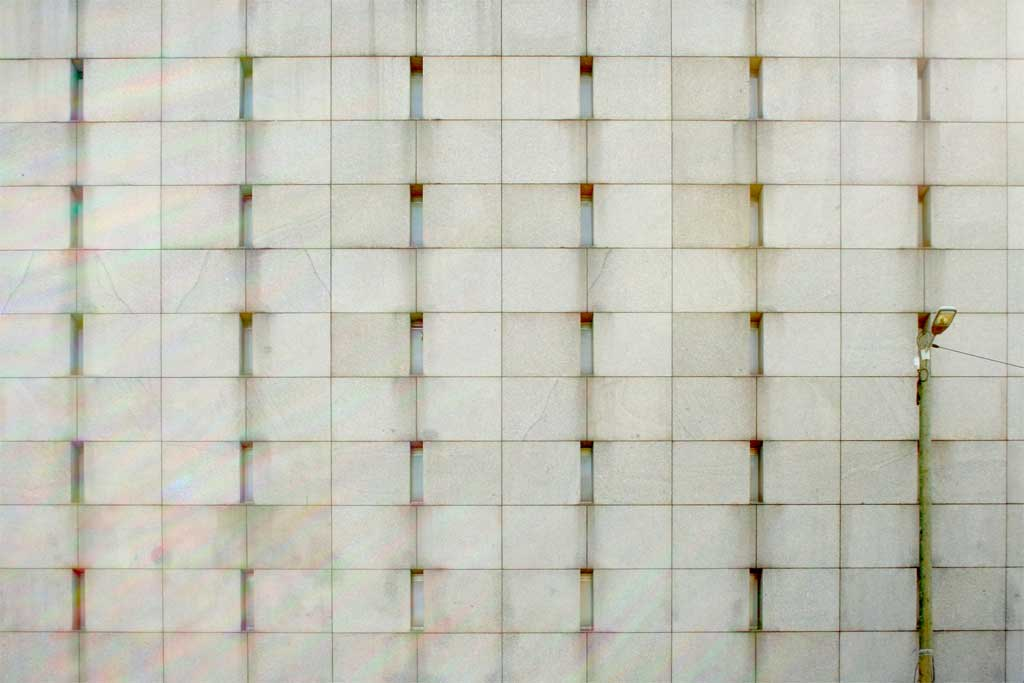
Facade of the 1971 building

In 1971, a six-storey archive building by architect Fritz Haferkamp was built at Severinstraße in the southern part of Cologne's city centre.

An underlying principle of the design was to protect archival records from fluctuations in weather and climate while creating a balanced room climate. In a move away from the contemporary popularity of electromechanical air conditioning, Haferkamp preferred a structural-physical, self-regulating solution that needed only little additional climate technology. As the Cologne Model, the building became a model for many later archive buildings internationally.

For maximum protection of the stack rooms against atmospheric exposure, an armored concrete frame was encased by a brick wall with a thickness of 49 centimetres (19 in). A facade was attached at a distance of 7 centimetres (2.8 in) from the brick wall, made from bright Czech granite. The interior walls were plastered with lime mortar that absorbed air moisture from the inside. The moisture diffused through the brick wall and was drained through the space between the wall and the facade. Only the basement rooms (located under a ceiling with a thickness of 30 centimetres or 12 inches) were artificially air-conditioned. Vertical light slots with a height of 130 centimetres (51 in) and a width of 25 centimetres (9.8 in) allowed only diffused light to pass to the interior wall, to prevent sunlight from causing any change in temperature. Only the ground floor was equipped with larger windows. The slots were also used for ventilation: opposing slots caused a stream of air that moved exactly parallel to the shelf rows. Each storey of the stacks building had a linear capacity of 4,221 metres (13,848 ft) of records on 647 square metres (6,960 sq ft) of effective surface. Rooms were 2.30 metres (7 ft 7 in) high, shelves rose to 2.25 metres (7 ft 5 in). Each shelf had a carrying capacity of 70 kilograms (150 lb).

The dominating stacks building was 21.4 metres (70 ft) high, 48.8 metres (160 ft) wide, and 16 metres (52 ft) deep, while the ground floor and basement of the complex were considerably larger. Towards Severinstraße, the ground floor consisted of the main entrance hall and an exhibition room. Adjacent were the reading room, approximately 20 office rooms, the restoration workshop, and various functional rooms. Four courtyards provided natural light to the rear ground floor rooms. The basement included the charters archive, the archival library, and, in its centre, a treasure bunker for charters and records walled by 60-centimetre-thick (24 in) armoured concrete. The building was secured by fire detectors, a carbon-dioxide-based fire-extinguishing system, and a burglar alarm device.

After the archive had moved from the 1897 building to its new home between 26 April and 20 June 1971, a little under 44% of the total capacity was in use. The building was planned to have sufficient capacity for 30 years of growth, but maximum capacity was reached in 1996 which led to the outsourcing of some records.

=== Collapse of the archive in 2009 ===
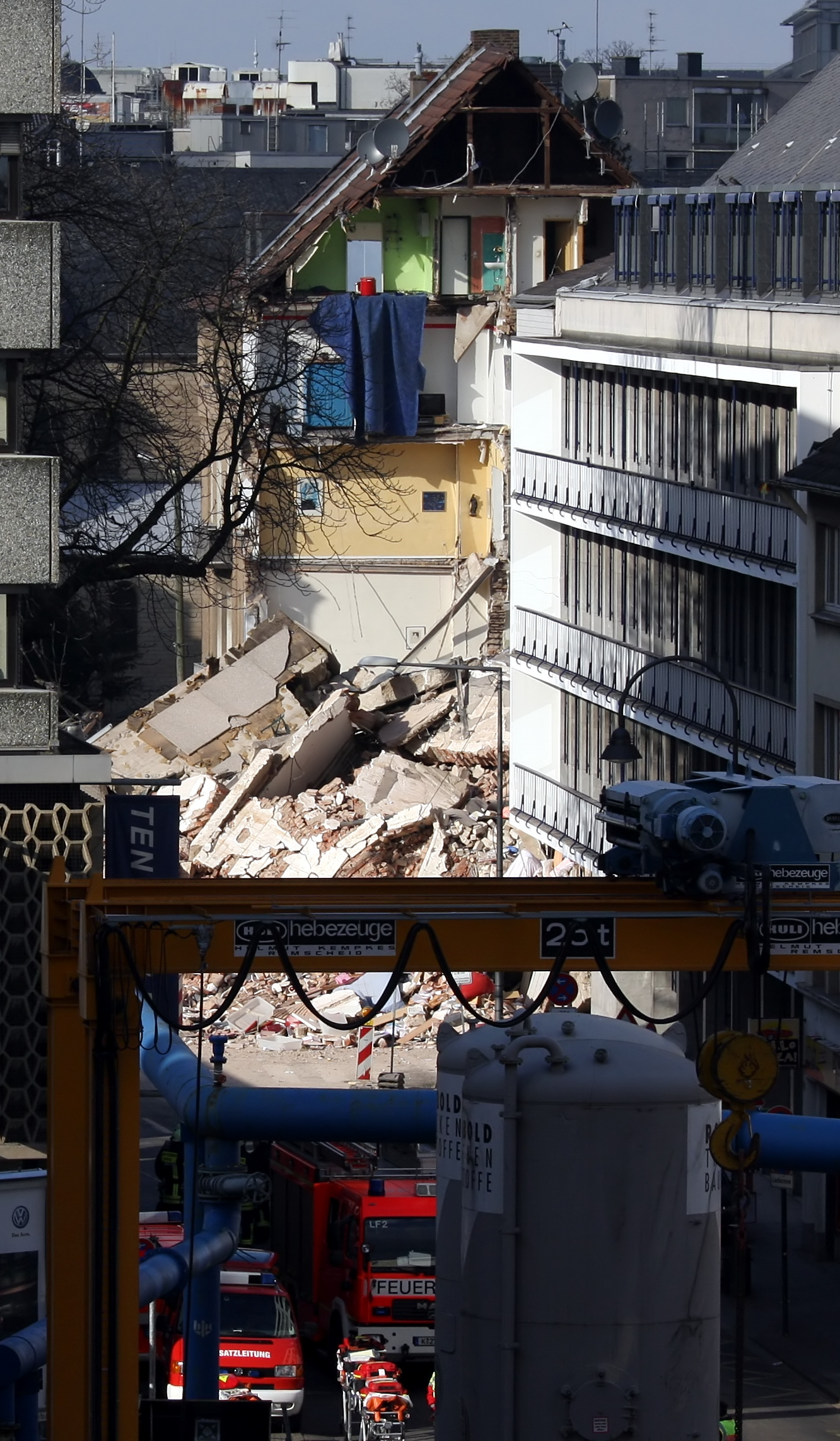
Collapsed archive and a neighbouring building in March 2009

On 3 March 2009 at 1:58 pm, the archive building collapsed. Public prosecutors in 2017 confirmed that the construction of a new underground railway line of the Cologne Stadtbahn system had been the cause. Construction workers building an underground switch facility noticed that water was flooding into the building pit. They rapidly warned staff and visitors of the archive, who were instructed to evacuate the building. Shortly afterwards, an underground landslide into the subway tunnel caused the archive building to collapse. Two adjacent apartment buildings also collapsed, killing two residents.

The main holdings of the archive were stored in the stacks building, including the medieval manuscripts of the Wallraf collection. Around 90% of archival records were buried by the collapse. Other holdings, mainly those stored in the ground floor extension with the reading room, such as the film and photograph collection and about 40,000 charters were evacuated. Storage of other – albeit less significant – parts of the records had been outsourced, and they were therefore not affected by the collapse. According to the former director Hugo Stehkämper, the collection of 80 shrine charters from the 12th century, a seals collection, and most inventory books were saved and remain intact.

=== After the collapse ===
The years after the collapse were characterized by three main tasks: the recovery and emergency conservation of the scattered archival documents; their step-by-step cleaning, restoration, and digitization; and the investigation of the cause for the disaster through a legal process. Additionally, the planning for a new archives building was begun.

A disaster recovery building (Bergungsbauwerk) was set up at the site of the collapse – a large hole in the ground – where around 95% of all archival items could be held until August 2011, albeit scattered and in many cases badly damaged. Archive repositories all over Germany offered space to store the damaged and only roughly cleaned documents: wet materials were flash-frozen to prevent mold growth, and itinerant archivists worked in the receiving archives all over the country to begin the task of re-identifying and re-cataloging. A newly installed centre for restoration and digitization on the outskirts of Cologne started operations in 2011, with a total cost for restoring the archive estimated at €400 million. A freeze-drying unit was installed to handle the deep-frozen materials safely before restoration.

After recovery at the collapsed site was completed, the legal process required the construction of an investigation building as part of the public prosecutor's process of determining responsibility for the collapse. Construction began in 2012.

Also in 2009, following an architectural competition, a decision was taken on a new archive building. It was planned to accommodate not only the archive institution itself but also the Kunst- und Museumsbibliothek, a renowned art and museum library, and the Rheinisches Bildarchiv, a collection of photographs on the history of art, architecture, culture, and photography in Cologne and the Rhineland. The plan was to build the "safest and state-of-the-art city archive in Europe" by 2017. After the decision of the city council, a detailed concept was worked out and approved.

In 2013, in the context of the city's financial crisis, local political debate began to move towards re-considering this decision, and even to imposing a planning moratorium. Protests by local support groups as well as national archive organizations followed.

In 2017, the total damage from the collapse was estimated at €1.2 billion.

Plans to combine the new archive with the art and museum library were eventually abandoned, and groundwork began in 2016 on a smaller, but still state-of-the-art archive building, which opened on 3 September 2021.

== Rhenish Picture Archive ==
From 1 January 2023, the Rhenish Picture Archive (Rheinisches Bildarchiv) was incorporated into the Historical Archive of the City of Cologne as Department 44/8. The two institutions are now housed within the same building, but the agreement between them (drawn up in consultation with the City of Cologne's Department of Culture) means that the Picture Archive continues to operate under its previous name. The respective responsibilities and services of the two bodies remain distinct, but they now function in close collaboration with one another.

== Holdings ==
Before the 2009 collapse, the archival holdings included:

- 65,000 charters from 922 CE to the present
- 26,000 linear metres (85,000 ft) of records
- 104,000 maps and plans
- 50,000 posters
- 800 estates, literary remains and other special collections

Among the 700 private deposits are those of writer and Nobel laureate Heinrich Böll, and writers Jakob Ignaz Hittorff, Irmgard Keun, and Hans Mayer, architects Ernst Friedrich Zwirner and Sulpiz Boisserée, collector Ferdinand Franz Wallraf, composers Jacques Offenbach and Max Bruch, conductor Günter Wand, and philosopher Vilém Flusser. Plans and drawings of architects Hans Schilling, Oswald Mathias Ungers, Wilhelm Riphahn, Karl Band, Gottfried Böhm, and Dominikus Böhm were also stored in the building.

All charters and privileges formerly stored in the town hall tower were catalogued in the first inventory (inventory number Alte Repertorien 6). This collection, also known as main charters archive (Haupturkundenarchiv), is regarded as the core part of the archive and was hence given the inventory number I.

Until 2009, all registers of births, marriages, and deaths were stored at the municipal civil registry offices regardless of their age. Following a reform bill of 13 March 2008, birth registers to 1898, marriage registers to 1928 and death registers to 1978 were transferred to the archives in 2009.

Many of the most important and unique holdings of the Cologne archives have been preserved on microfilm in the central safekeeping archive of Germany, the Barbarastollen caves in Oberried in the Black Forest region. The Barbarastollen holds around 638 microfilms with one million images in varying grades of quality from the various Cologne collections, including the municipal archive. In addition, the 1,400 medieval manuscript books of the archives were microfilmed by the Hill Museum & Manuscript Library in the 1980s. However, recent acquisitions (including the Heinrich Böll collection) have not yet been microfilmed. According to director Schmidt-Czaia, the archive has digitized only a tiny fraction of its holdings.

The Marburg photo archive of old charters holds high-quality black and white photographs of 284 charters from the Cologne archive.

== List of directors ==
Directors of the Cologne municipal archive:

Director	Time	Photo
Johann Jakob Peter Fuchs	1815–1857	
Leonhard Ennen	1857–1880	
Konstantin Höhlbaum	1880–1890	
Joseph Hansen	1891–1927	
Erich Kuphal	1932–1960	
Arnold Güttsches	1960–1969	
Hugo Stehkämper	1969–1994	
Everhard Kleinertz	1994–2004	
Bettina Schmidt-Czaia	2004–2025	
Ulrich Fischer	2025–	

== Bibliography ==
- Die Chronik Kölns. Chronik Verlag, Dortmund 1991, ISBN 3-611-00193-7
- Mitteilungen aus dem Stadtarchiv von Köln (since 1882), for older volumes see de.wikisource
- Wolfgang Herborn: Schreinswesen, -buch, -karte. In: Lexikon des Mittelalters. Vol. 7, cols. 1557–1559
