= Alpine Path =

One of the highest hiking trails in the Black Forest, Germany

Coordinates: 47°52′14″N 7°58′04″E

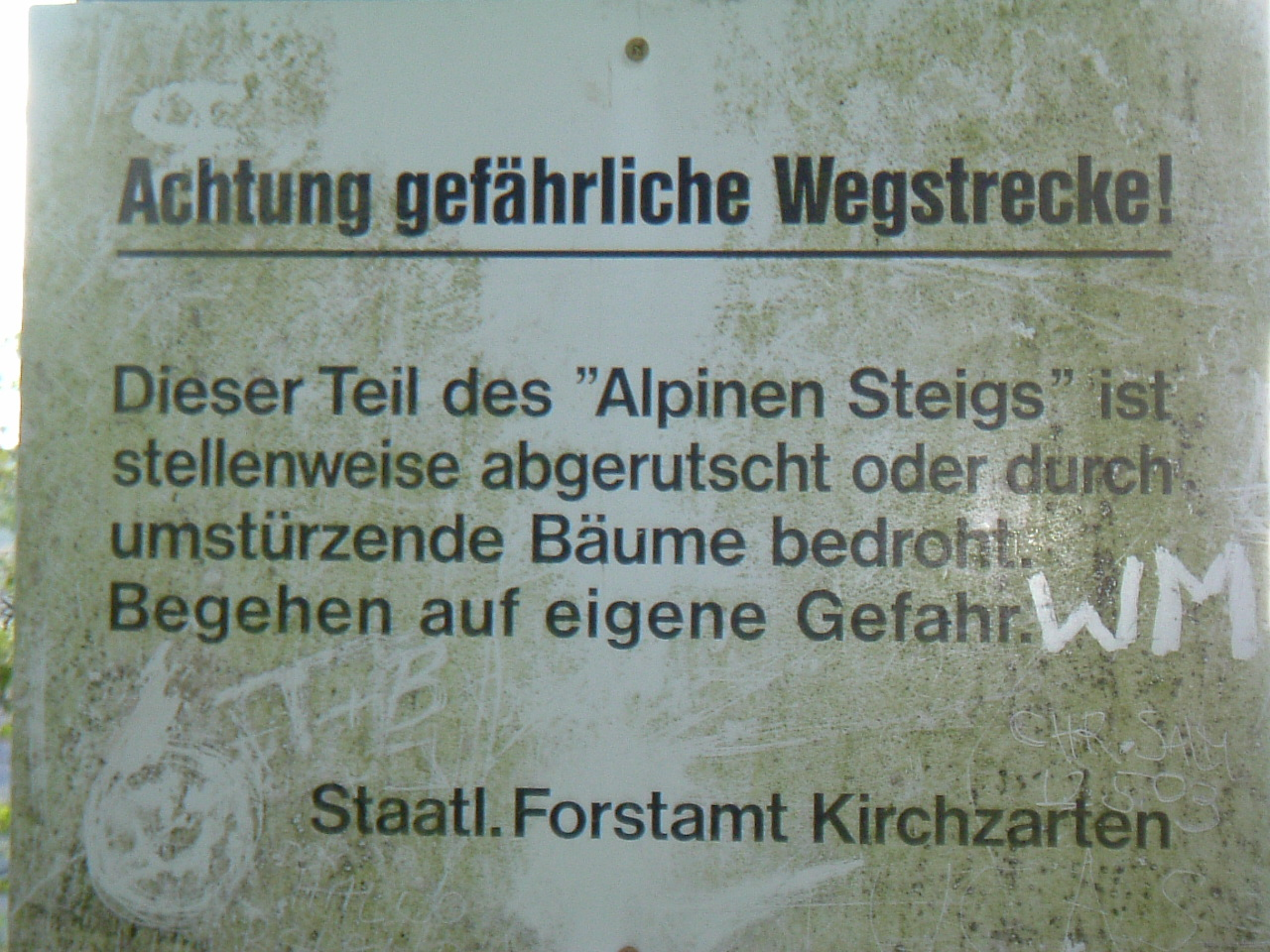
Warning sign at the start of the Alpine Path

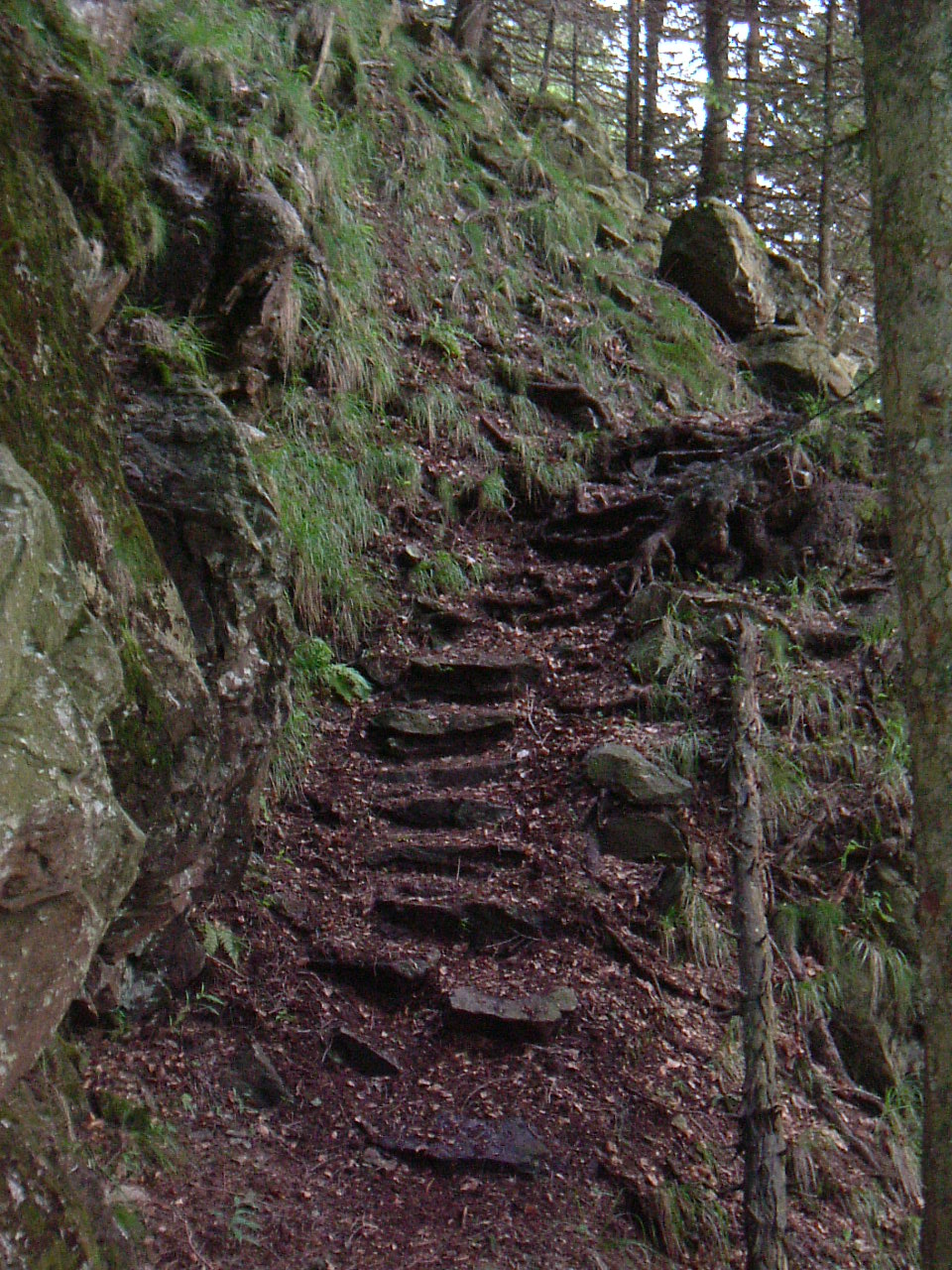
Typical section of the Alpine Path

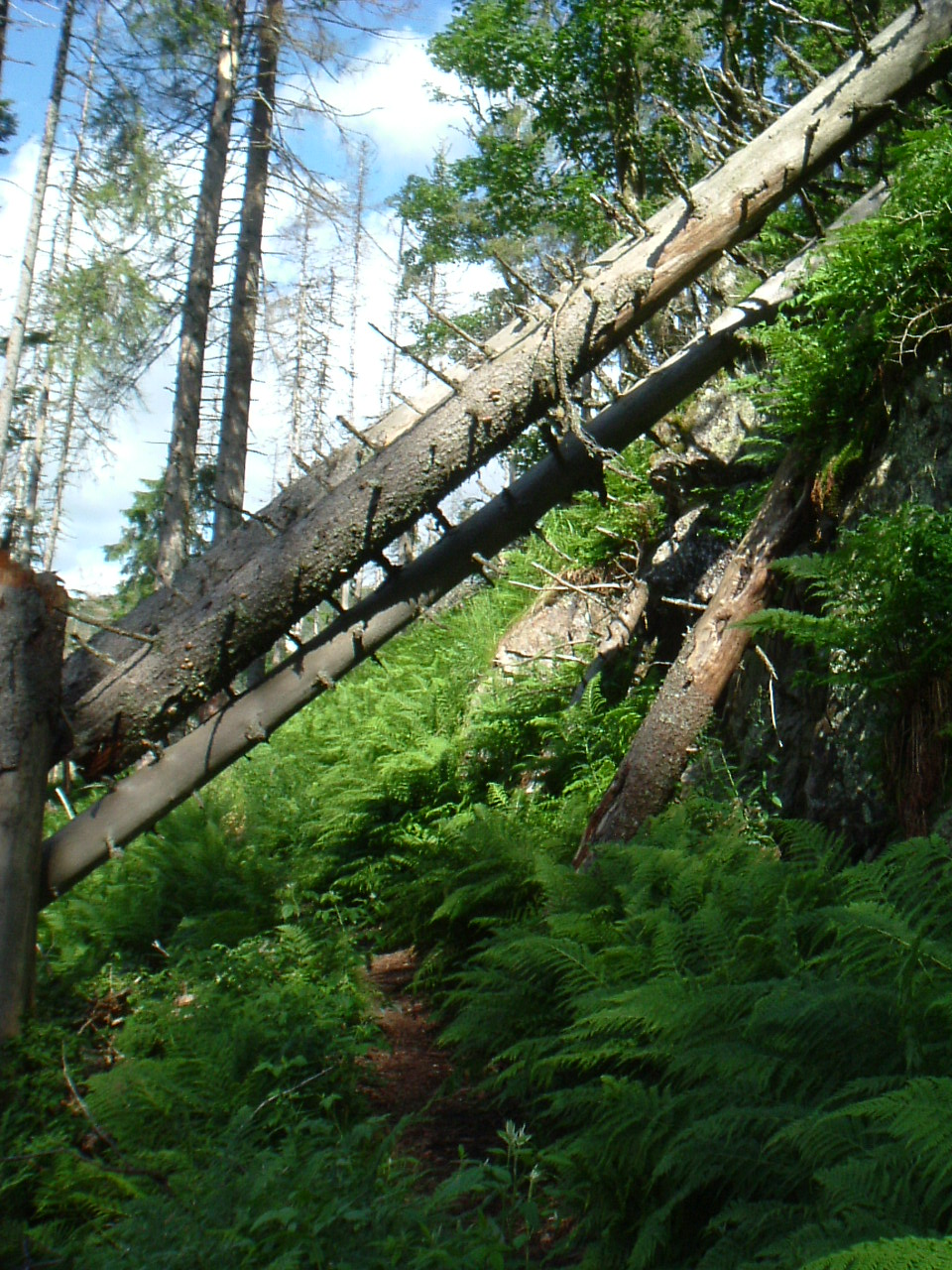
Fallen trees lying across the Alpine Path

The Alpine Path (German: Alpine Pfad or Alpine Steig) is one of the highest hiking trails in the Black Forest. Between Hüttenwasen and Stübenwasen the path runs largely horizontally across the rocky northern mountainside of the Feldberg in southern Germany. The trail is 3½ kilometres long and was abandoned by the forestry authorities in order to encourage the development of nature.

== Location ==
The way runs above the Napf, the head of the St. Wilhelm Valley and below the St. Wilhelmer Hut and the summit of the Feldberg. From the Hüttenwasen, it runs clockwise around the Napf, about half-way between the Feldberg summit and the valley bottom.

The Alpine Path can be accessed from the Stollenbacher Hut (approach from the Zastler valley) or the Erlenbacher Hut (approach from Oberried) at the Toter Mann via the Hüttenwasen, likewise from the Todtnauer Hut (via the Stübenwasen).

== Character ==
The path is unusual in that it is one of the few hiking trails in the Black Forest that runs through characteristic alpine terrain with rocks and steep ravines. Other paths that it meets are the Felsenweg above the Feldsee, a path to the Schultiskopf above the Simonswälder Valley, the Felsenweg near Oberried and the link from the Feldberg Pass to the Bernau Cross. The name of the path comes from the alpine vegetation that grows on the shaded and relatively inaccessible northern slopes of the Feldberg, one of the last refuges for such flora in the Black Forest.

The Alpine Path runs through mixed woods, which consist of beech, rowan, sycamore, spruce, silver fir and Douglas fir, with the conifers predominating. The path runs across rock faces, avalanche slopes and the open cattle pastures typical of the Black Forest (at the Hüttenwasen and below the St.-Wilhelmer Hut) where today pioneer species may be found in places. Especially clear is the environmental damage of recent years in the numerous dead trees that stand below the Feldberg summit and the Stübenwasen. The path ends immediately behind the Stübenwasen cross.

The path has not been signposted by the Black Forest Club for several years. It is nevertheless still negotiable and has been marked with home-made wooden signs or red markings on the initiative of private individuals. In many places the route is blocked by fallen trees. In summer it is also heavily overgrown and difficult to follow in places. This is especially so of the ascent from the Stübenwasen and the descent to St. Wilhelm.
