= Hinterwaldkopf =

Mountain in Germany

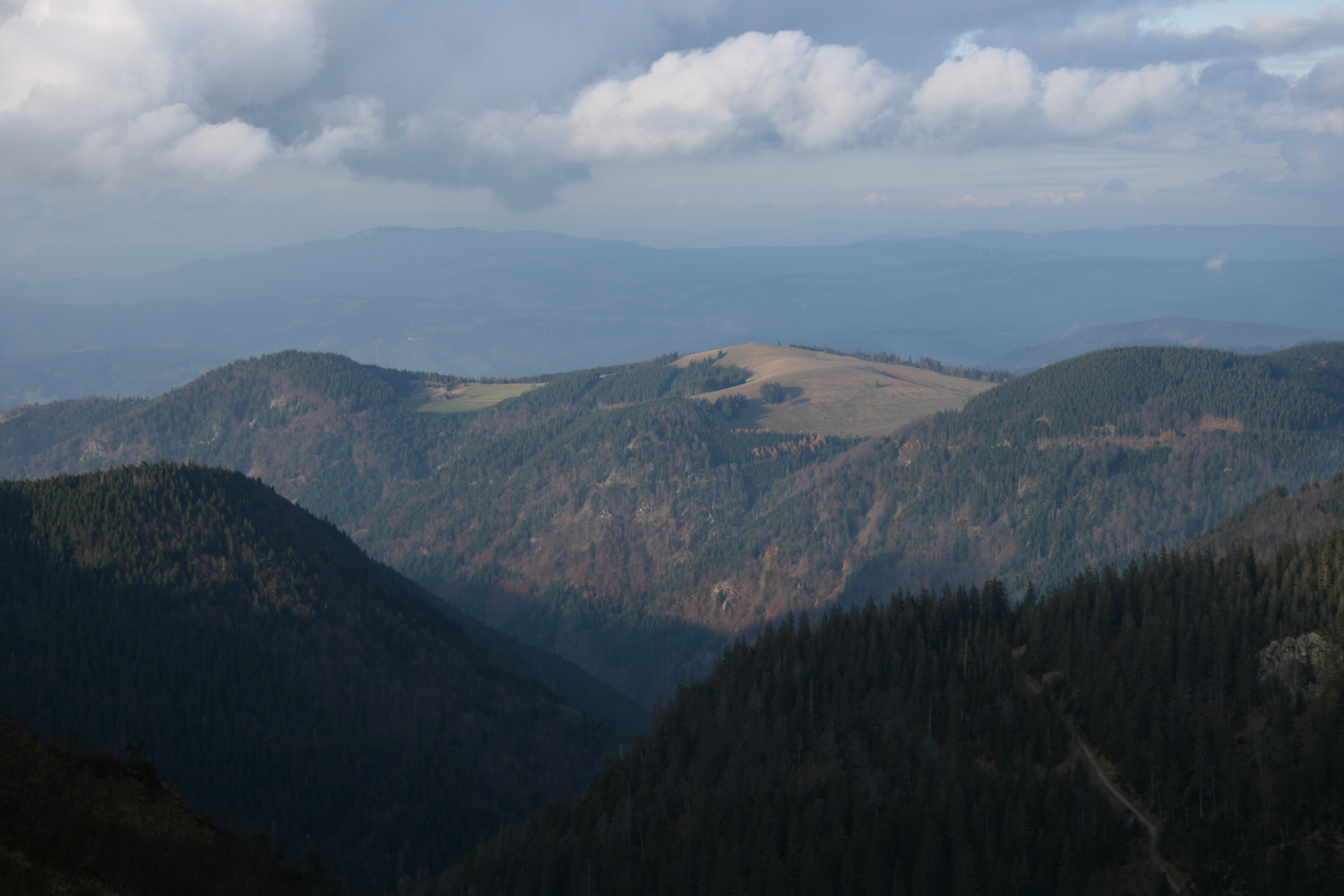
- The Hinterwaldkopf across the upper Zastler valley

Highest point
- Elevation: 1,198 m (3,930 ft)
- Coordinates: 47°55′8″N 08°01′00″E

Geography
- Location within Baden-Württemberg
- Location: Baden-Württemberg, Germany

The Hinterwaldkopf is a mountain, 1,198.2 m above sea level (NHN), in the Southern Black Forest in Germany. It lies in the southeastern part of the catchment area of the Dreisam east of Freiburg im Breisgau between Kirchzarten and Hinterzarten. To the north it is bounded by the Höllental valley, to the south by the Zastler valley. Nearby settlements include Kirchzarten, Oberried (Breisgau), Falkensteig (part of Buchenbach) and Hinterzarten.

The characteristic outline of the Hinterwaldkopf is a symbol of the Dreisam valley. Its open summit region offers views over the valley to the Kandel. A trail managed by the Black Forest Club runs over the mountain.

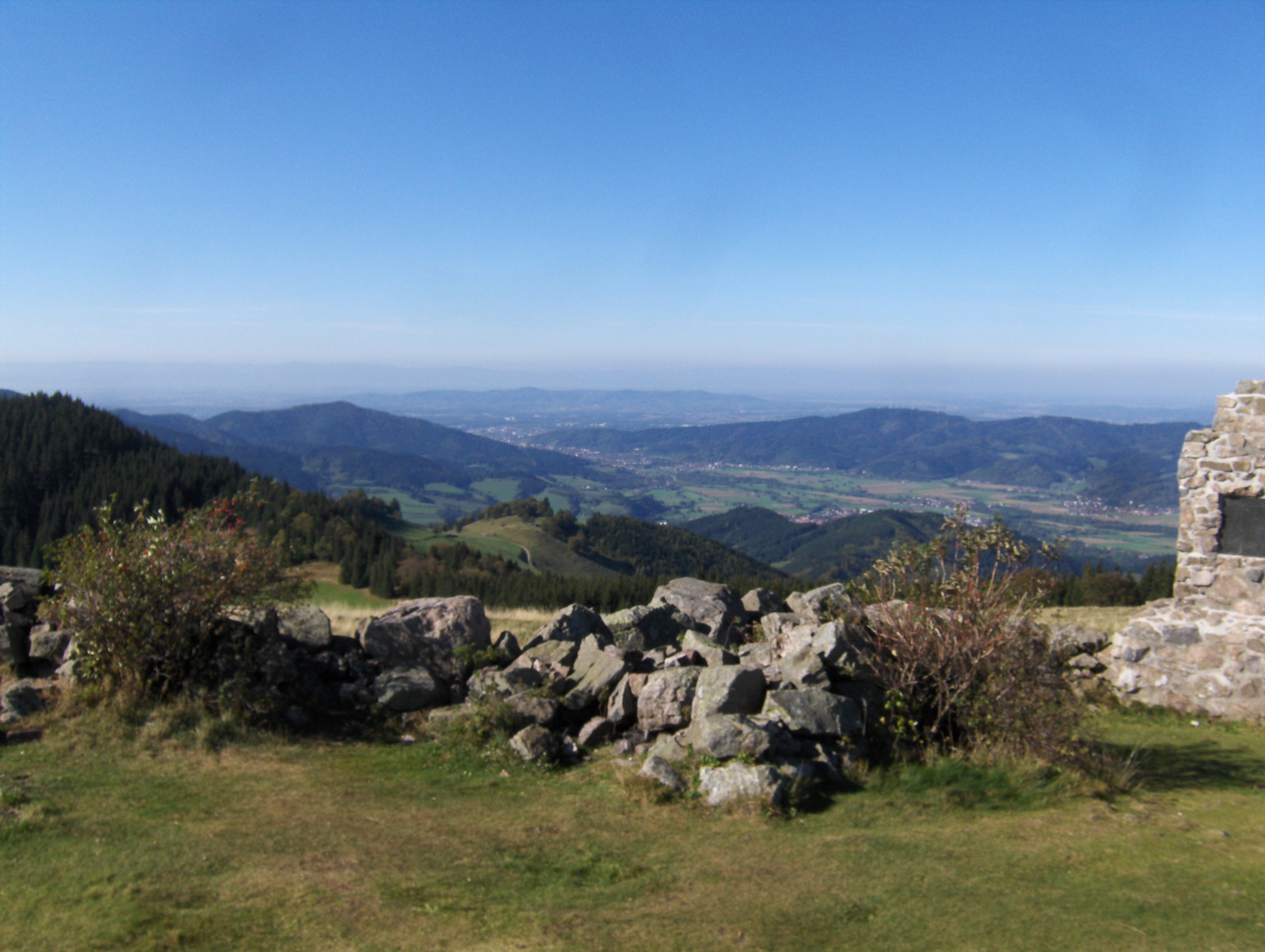
View from the Hinterwaldkopf of the Dreisam Valley and Freiburg
