= Zastler Loch =

Valley in the Central Uplands of Germany

Coordinates: 47°52′35.04″N 8°0′34.92″E

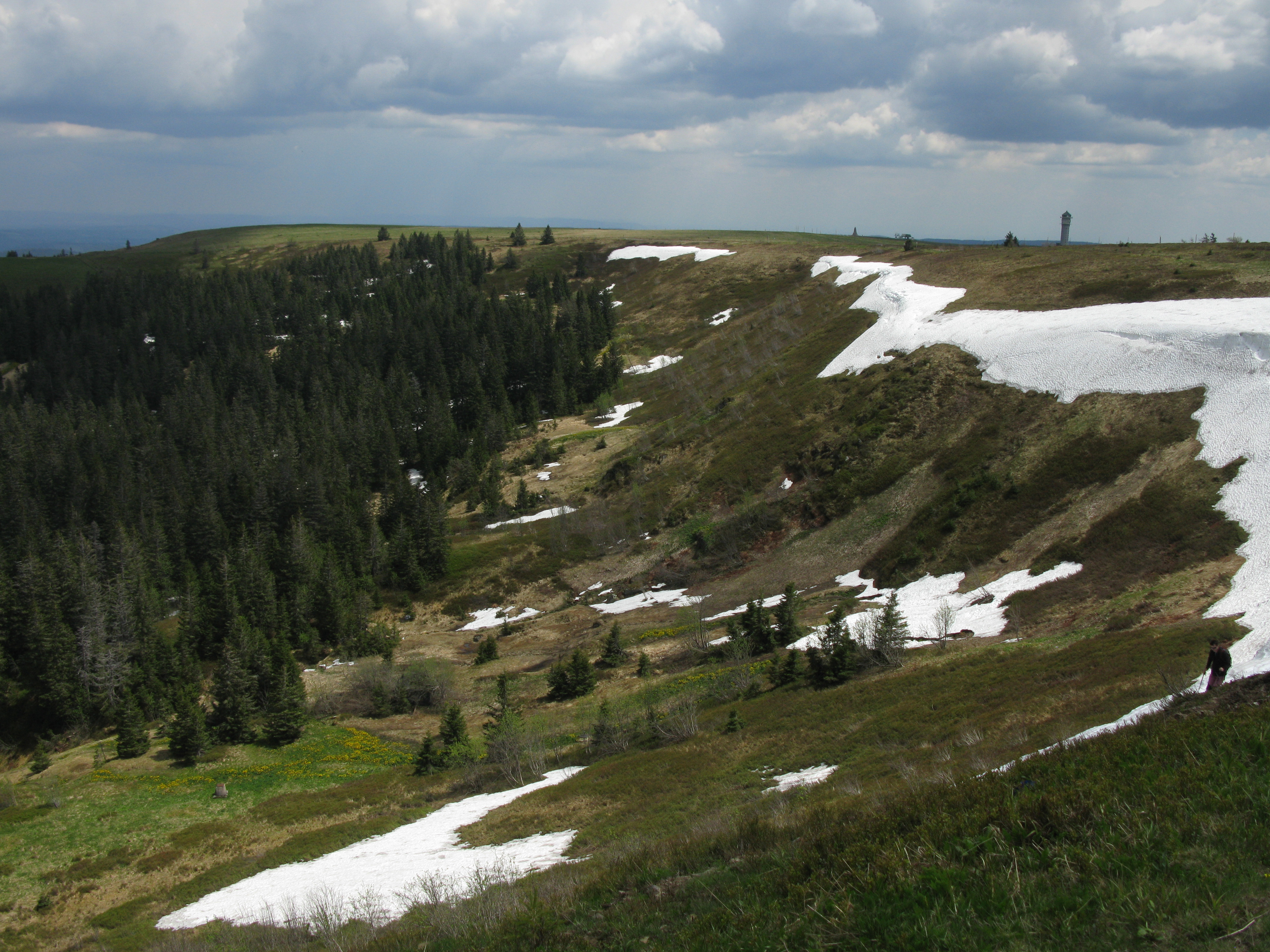
Upper slopes of the Zastler Loch with remains of the snow cornice (June 2013)

The Zastler Loch or Zastler Cirque (German: Zastlerkar) on the northern side of the Feldberg summit in the Black Forest is the highest cirque in the German Central Uplands. It forms the head of the Zastler valley, through which the Zastlerbach stream flows northwards into the Dreisam.

== Geology ==
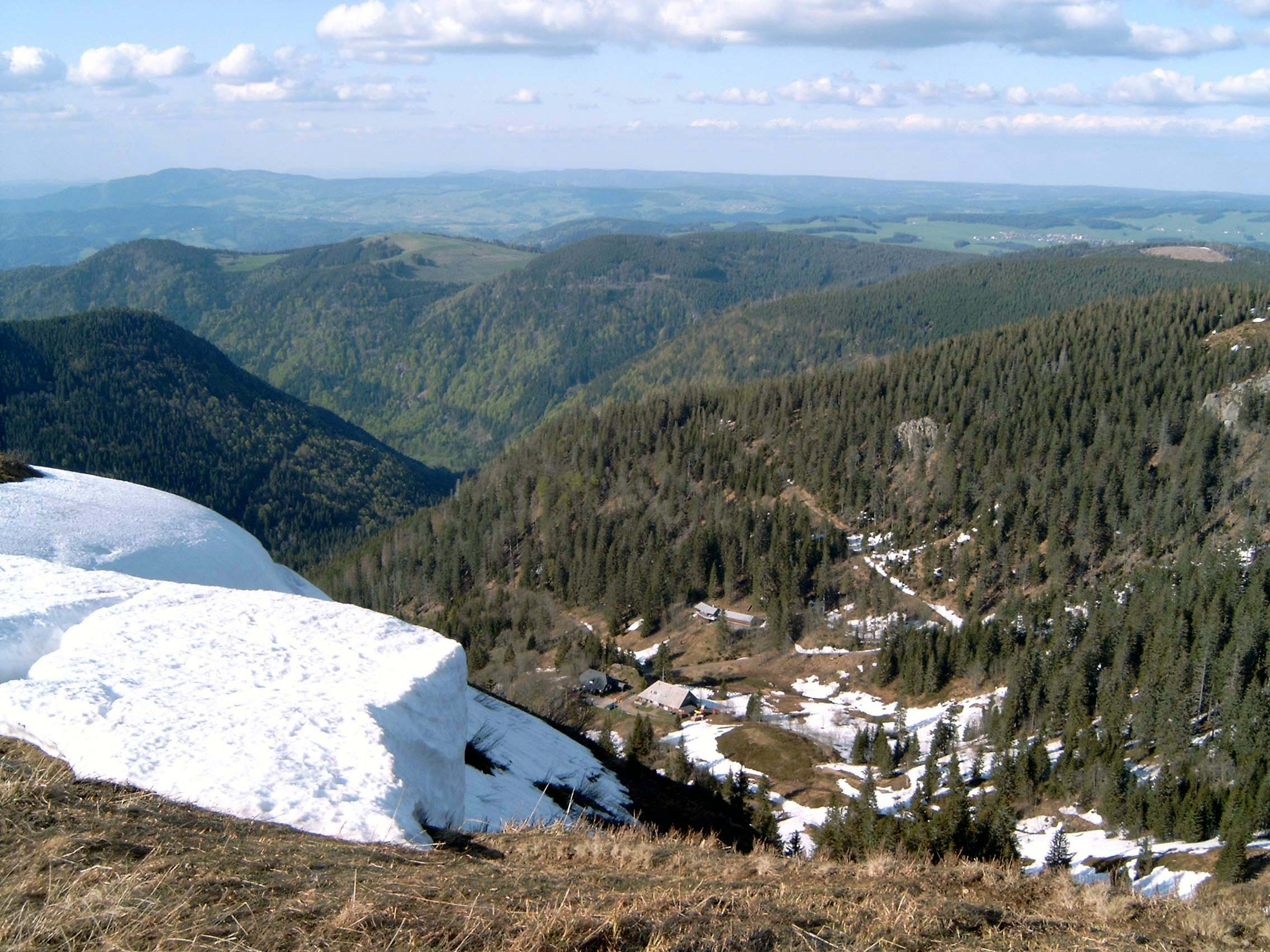
View from the edge of the cirque of its lowest step near the Zastler Hut

The Zastler Loch is a cirque stairway with 3 deeply carved cirque floors: one at 1,400 metres, a heavily destroyed one at 1,320 metres and a well preserved floor at 1,250 metres; all three being linked to one another by rockfalls. The lowest floor has retained its old hollow shape and is entirely covered by bog. This bog, east of the Zastler Hut, is about 100 metres long and 40 metres across. The bog is sealed on the right hand rock face by a 12-metre-high curved false embankment. This consists of gneiss covered by terminal moraine material. Between the bank and the rock face there is a small hollow, about two metres deep, that was probably formed by a small river of ice from the gully to the southeast. The height difference between the lower cirque step and the upper edge of the rock face is 150 to 200 metres. Glacial striations may be seen on free-standing rocks around the Zastler Hut.

== Nature and culture ==
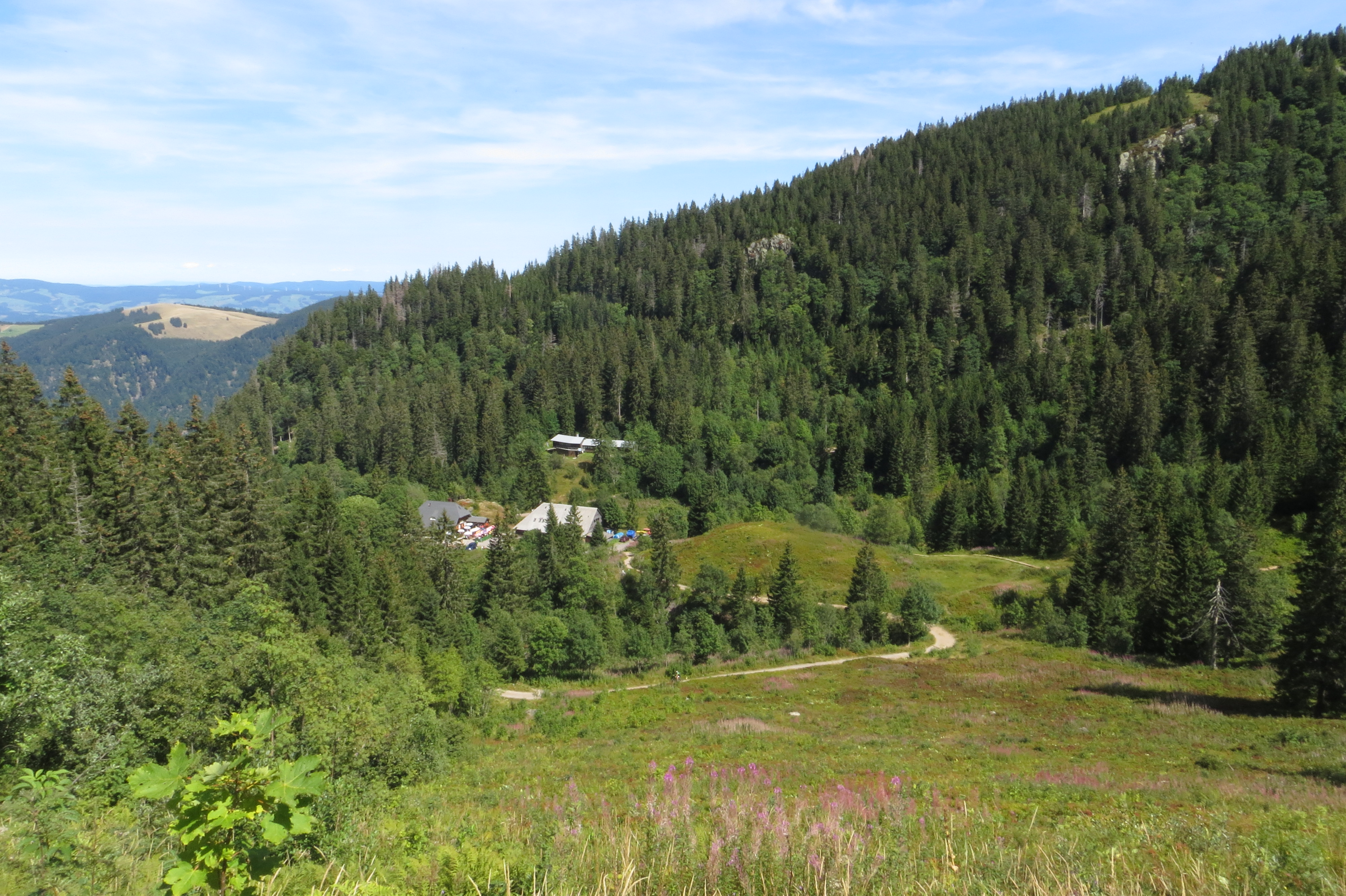
The bottom of the Zastler Loch. Centre: the Zastler Hut

Das Zastler Loch is the source region of the Zastlerbach stream. In winter the slopes of the cirque are prone to the formation of cornices and to avalanches. Sometimes the snow remains until well into the summer months. Around 1840, when a cold period dominated Europe, the inhabitants of the eastern and northern Feldberg region cut the snowfield to the ground because they feared a glaciation of the Feldberg. Since 1651 there has been grazing in the Zastler Loch. The former cattle hut, the Zastler Hut is a restaurant today. Next to it is the Freiburger Hut which was built in 1952 for the Freiburg Ski Club. Charcoal burning sites may also be seen in the Zastler Loch.

The Zastler Loch is part of the Feldberg Nature Reserve and forms one of the most valuable locations within it for plant species. An initiative by members of the Black Forest Club and the Black Forest Conservation Working Party prevent plans in the 1960s for ski slopes and a gondola lift here.

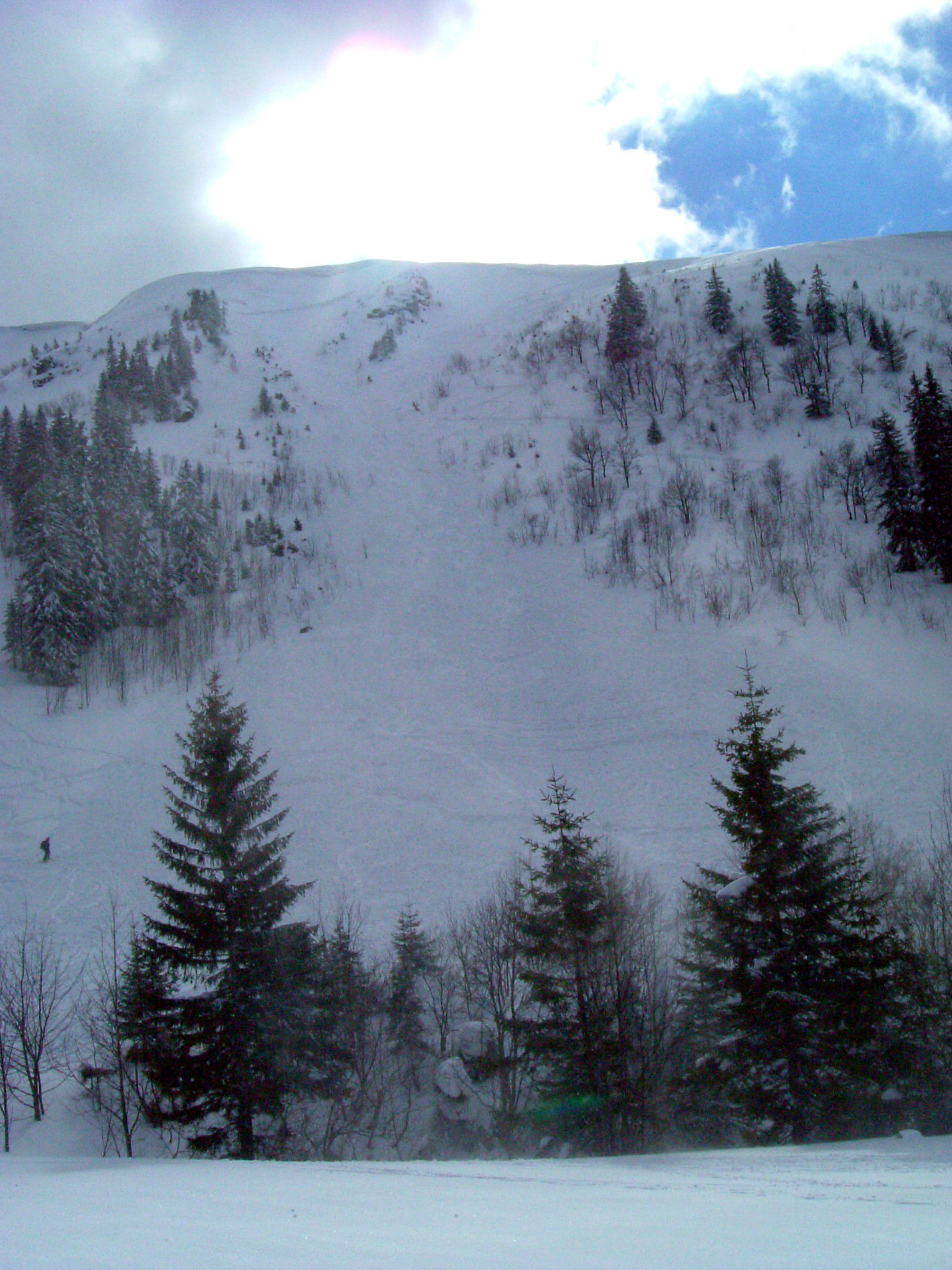
Mountainside in the Zastler Loch following an avalanche

== Accidents ==
- On 23 February 1941 three skiers in the Zastler Loch were caught by an avalanche. The mountain rescue team was also hit by another avalanche, in which a team member, Fritz Nübling from Freiburg, died.
- On 2 February 1953 a cornice collapsed causing a 54-year-old skier from Heidelberg to fall to his death.
- On 20 January 1959 a woman from Düsseldorf who was studying in Freiburg died when a cornice collapsed.
- On 9 January 1966 the body of a mountain rescuer from Kirchzarten, Walter Wernet, was discovered after he had died few days earlier in an avalanche.
- Almost at the same spot a 28-year-old lieutenant in the Gebirgsjäger, Wolfgang Ehret, died on 9 March 1980 in a great avalanche.
- On 30 January 2015 two touring skiers were buried in an avalanche from the cornice above the Zastler Hut. Whilst one of the two was able to free himself, a 20-year-old man from Freiburg was not found until just under 2 hours after the accident. Despite resuscitation being carried out, he died later that afternoon.

== Literature ==
- Ekkehard Liehl: Das Zastler Loch, der Kern des subalpinen Naturschutzgebietes Feldberg. In: Mitteilungen des Badischen Landesvereins für Naturkunde und Naturschutz e.V., Freiburg i. Br.; N.F. 9: Issue 1, 1966, pp. 1–10 (online).
- Regierungspräsidium Freiburg (publ.): Der Feldberg – Subalpine Insel im Schwarzwald. Jan Thorbecke Verlag, Ostfildern, 2012, ISBN 978-3-7995-0757-8, pp. 46 ff.
- August Vetter: Feldberg im Schwarzwald, Selbstverlag der Gemeinde Feldberg (Schwarzwald), 1996
