= Stollenbach =

Stollenbach may refer to:

- Stollenbach (Speller Aa), a river of Lower Saxony, Germany, upper reach of the Speller Aa
- Stollenbach (Black Forest), a mountain of the Black Forest, Baden-Württemberg, Germany
