= Erlenbacher Hut =

Coordinates: 47.9000°N 07.9650°E

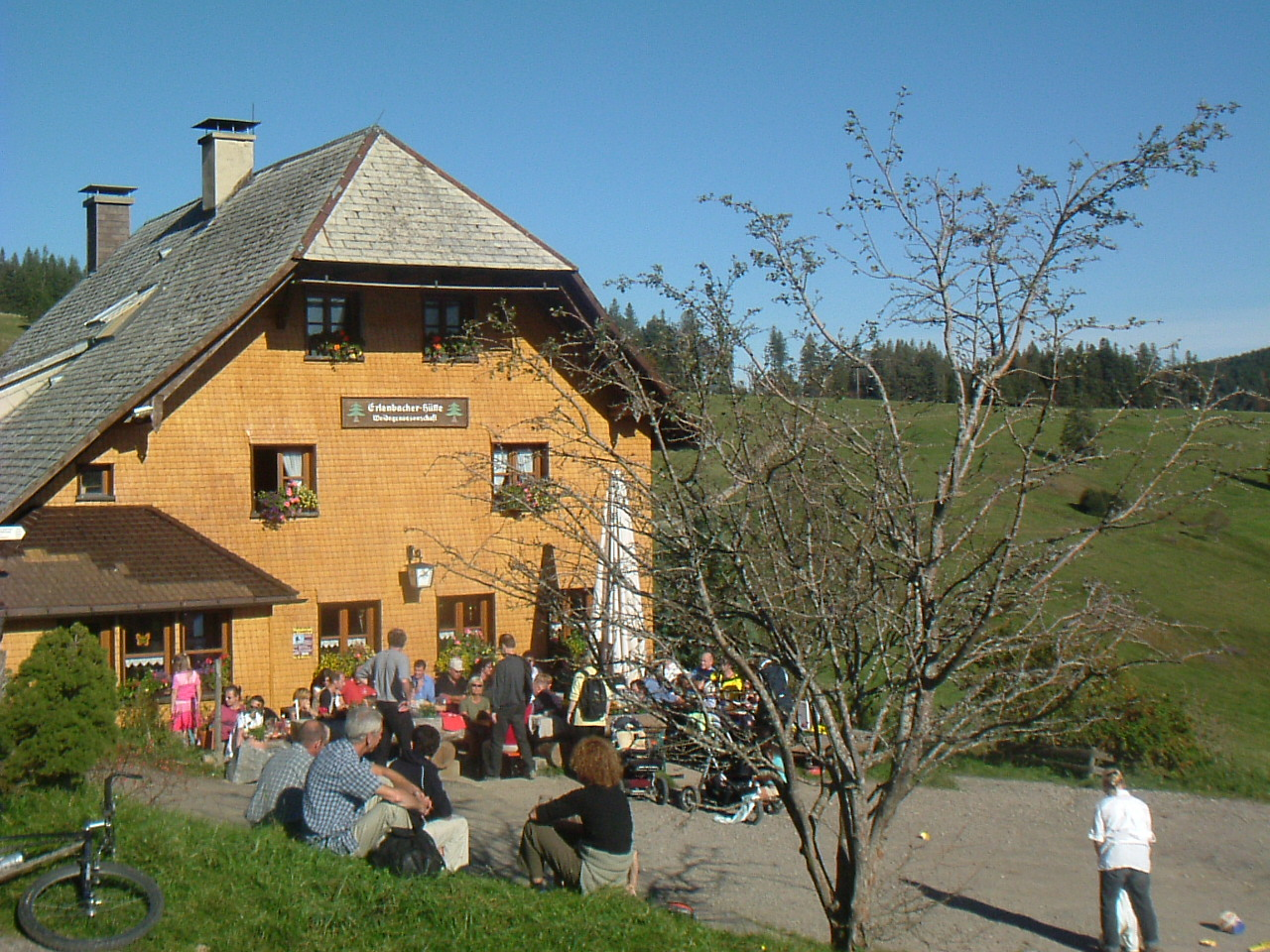
The Erlenbacher Hut with outdoor catering. View looking E

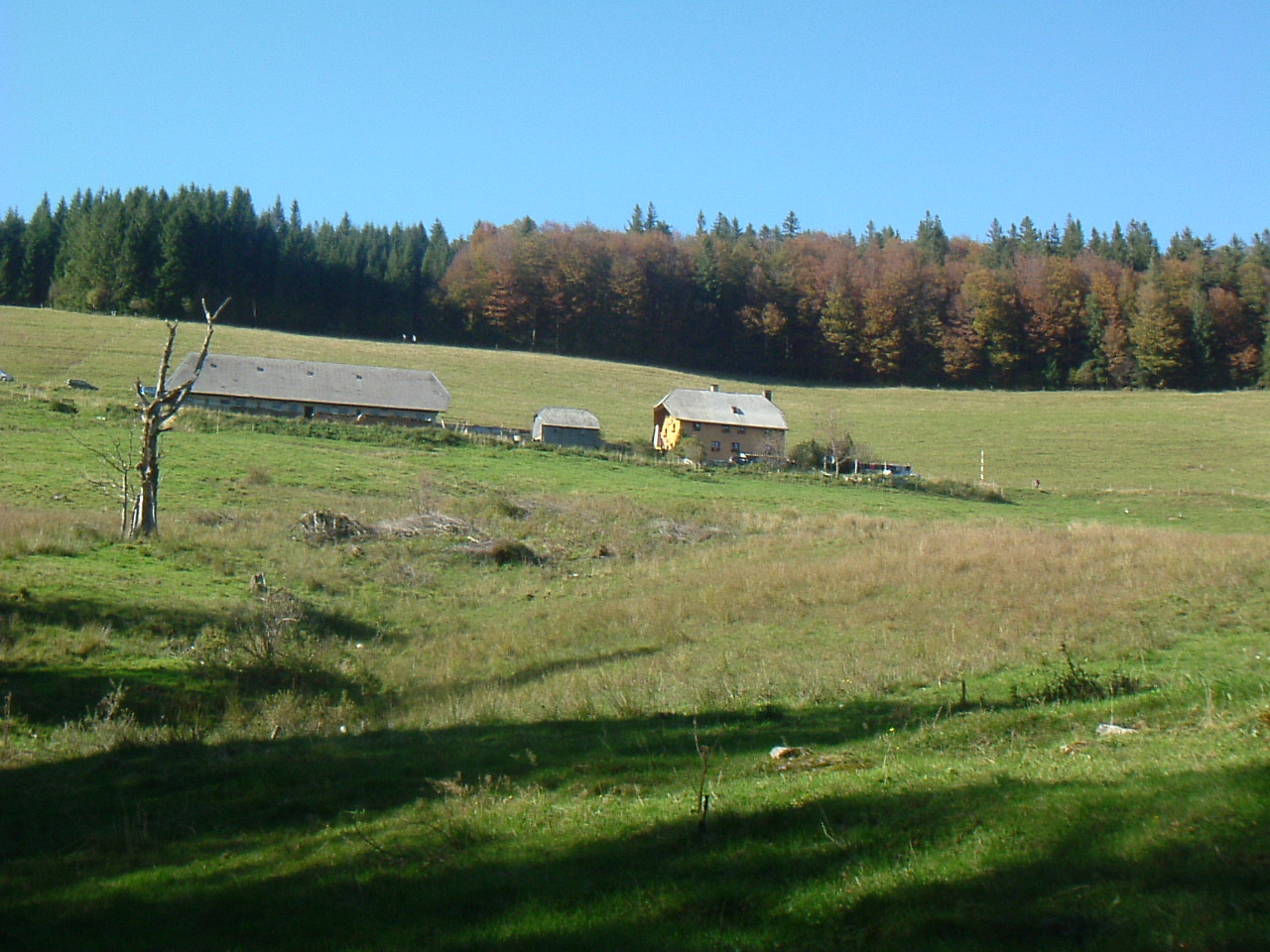
View of the Erlenbacher Hut from the Wilhelmer Tal

The Erlenbacher Hut (German: Erlenbacher Hütte) is an inn and cattle hut (Almhütte) on the Erlenbach stream (about 1,100 m above NN) in the Black Forest in Germany.

== History ==
For centuries, cattle were kept over the summer near the Erlenbach stream by a grazing co-operative. Since the soils at 1,300 metres above sea level are not suitable for intensive agricultural use, it was primarily young cattle that were grazed. The pasture cooperative appointed a so-called herder who managed the cattle hut. In former times a herdsman, who was responsible for the cattle, assisted him. Today the herder manages the Erlenbacher Hut and looks after the animals. Thanks to well-developed roads and its own mains electricity, the Erlenbacher Hut can be occupied all year round by the herder and his family. The name Erlenbach could refer to a community of alder trees or it could be a person's name such as Erlebrand or Erlebrecht.

It is clear from documents that the Erlenbach pasture cooperative already existed around A.D. 1000 or 1100. However, whether they were already using the Erlenbach as a highland pasture is not proven.

In the 12th century, the place name "Erlibach" as a designation for a forest located under the Feldberg, first appeared in a bill of sale. The Erlenbach was sold several times over the course of the centuries, inter alia around 1327 to the Williamites. In 1472, the Erlenbach farm is first mentioned, which at that time consisted of a dwelling house and a stable for the animals of the herder. In subsequent documents, the Erlenbacher Hof is pledged and sold several times. In this case the (usually 12 or 13) members of the Erlenbach Grazing Cooperative (Erlenbacher Weidegenossenschaft) are often named as owners. Since the 17th century an almost unbroken line of herders and innkeepers have occupied the hut. In 1769 a new combined domestic house and cattle hut were built.

In the 1960s it was planned to open up the Erlenbach area for ski tourism, but this plan did not come to fruition.

== Today ==
Currently Axel Brüstle and his wife, Karin Arens, are the herder and innkeeper at the Erlenbacher Hut, which is still maintained as a grazing cooperative. In summer the family looks after about 120 head of cattle on the Erlenbacher Weide, which covers 80 hectares at a height of between 1,100 and 1,300 metres above sea level.

== Access ==
The Erlenbach is accessible by car from Oberried and is usually used as the starting point for numerous walks in the Feldberg region. It is especially suited as a base for the Alpine Path (Alpiner Pfad), one of the highest trails in the Black Forest, which runs through the Alpine terrain of the northern cliffs of the Feldberg and Stübenwasen. The exposed nature and Alpine character of the Alpiner Pfad are unusual for the Black Forest.

== Sources ==
- Günther Haselier, Franz Fresle, Max Weber: In Marcha Zardunense – Geographie und Geschichte des Zartener Beckens. Kirchzarten, 1966.
- K. Haserodt, W. Stülpnagel: Die Gemeinde Oberried mit den Ortsteilen Hofsgrund, St. Wilhelm und Zastler. Freiburg, 1974.
- Wolfgang Hilger: Geschichte von 68 Höfen und Häusle im Kirchspiel Oberried. Oberried, 2003.
- Wolfgang Hilger: Höfe und Gebäude im Kirchspiel Oberried in früherer Zeit. Oberried, 2003.
- Ferdinand Gießler: Die Geschichte des Wilhelmitenklosters. Oberried, 1911 and 2001.
- Ernst M. Wallner: Zastler. Oberried, 1953 and 1990.
