= Toter Mann (Black Forest) =

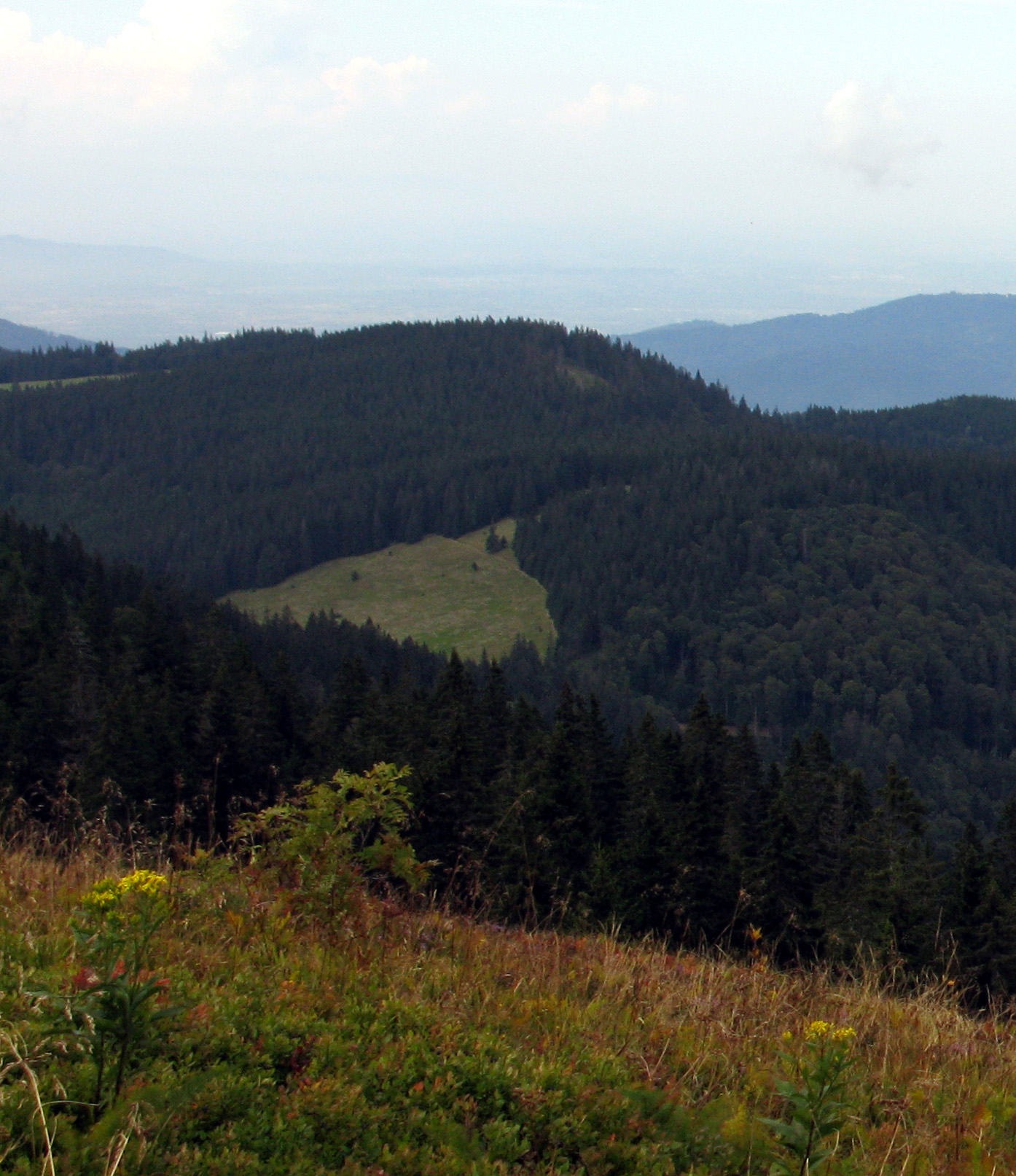
- View from the Feldberg of the Toter Mann

Highest point
- Elevation: 1,320.7 m above sea level (NHN) (4,333 ft)
- Coordinates: 47°53′33″N 7°59′26″E

Geography
- Location within Baden-Württemberg
- Location: Baden-Württemberg, Germany
- Parent range: Black Forest

The Toter Mann ("Dead Man") is a mountain, 1,320.7 m above sea level (NHN) high, in the Southern Black Forest in Baden-Württemberg. It lies southeast of Freiburg im Breisgau in the municipality of Oberried.
