= Cirque stairway =

Stepped succession of glacially eroded rock basins

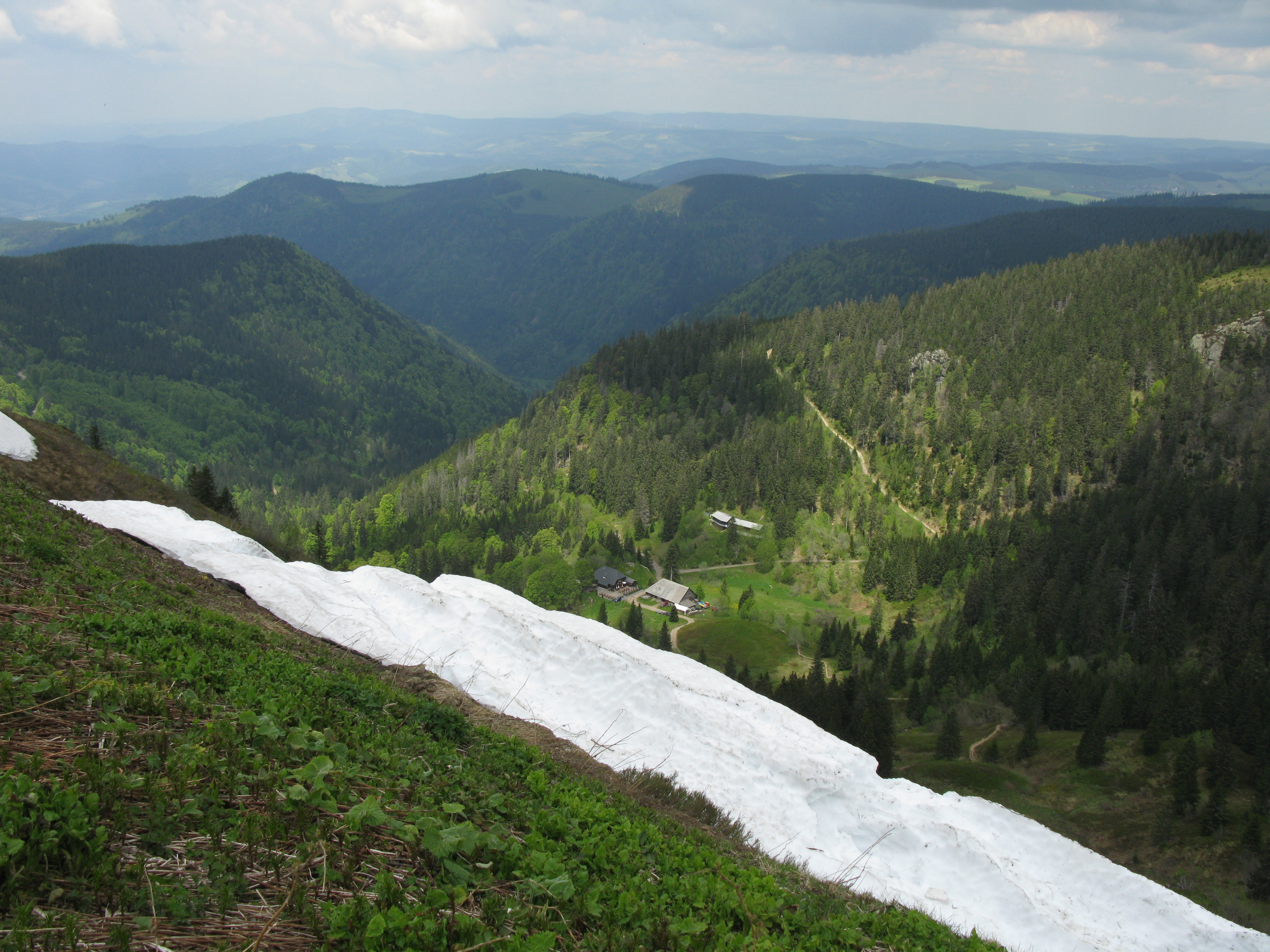
View of the Zastler Loch, a cirque stairway in the Black Forest

A cirque stairway or sequence of cirque steps is a stepped succession of glacially eroded rock basins. Their individual formation is that of a cirque.

These steps are arranged one above and behind the other at different heights in the terrain and caused by the same morphodynamic processes, albeit resulting in different landform shapes depending on the type of rock and the depositional circumstances involved. The lower step often lacks the steep headwalls typical of cirques.

A well-known example is the Zastler Loch below the summit of the Feldberg, the highest mountain of the Black Forest in Germany.
