= Hermann Weinsberg =

Herman Weinsberg
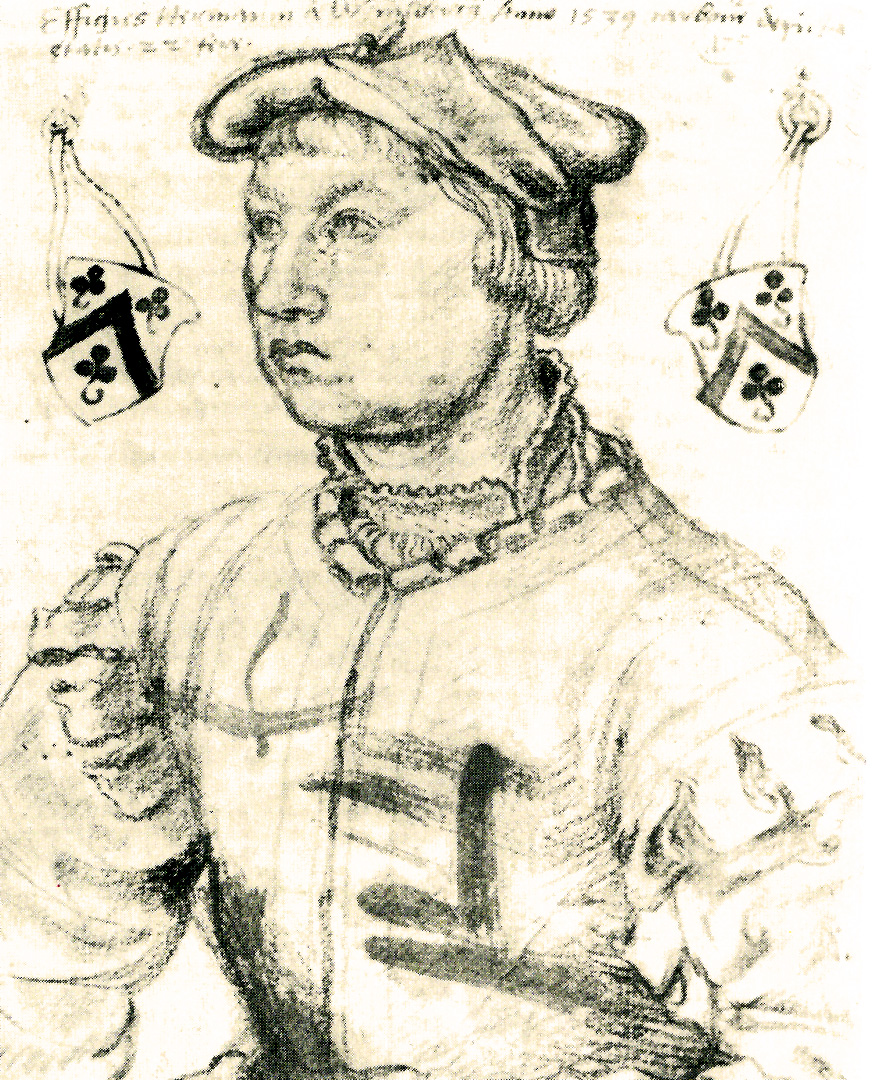
- Weinsberg aged 22

Cologne city councillor
- In office 1565–1597

Personal details
- Born: 3 January 1518 Cologne
- Died: 23 March 1597 (aged 79) Cologne
- Citizenship: Cologne
- Spouse(s): (1) Weisgin Ripgin (2) Drutgin Barß
- Education: School of the Brethren of the Common Life, Emmerich am Rhein
- Alma mater: University of Cologne
- Occupation: legal practice and wine trade
- Profession: lawyer
- Known for: autobiographical writings
- Wrote: Das Buch Weinsberg
- Website: www.weinsberg.uni-bonn.de/index.htm

Military service
- Allegiance: City of Cologne
- Years of service: 1583–1587
- Rank: captain
- Unit: company of the watch

Hermann Weinsberg, also known as Hermann von Weinsberg (1518–1597) was a city councillor in Cologne and a diarist whose autobiographical writings, long obscure, are now considered to be of historical importance.

== Life ==
Weinsberg was born in Cologne on 3 January 1518, the oldest son of a wine merchant. He was educated at the school of the Brethren of the Common Life in Emmerich am Rhein (1531–1534), and at Cologne University (1534–1543), where he held a scholarship and took the degrees Bachelor of Arts, Master of Arts, Bachelor of Law and Licentiate of Law. In 1543 he was elected to the city council. In 1549 he resigned from the city council to hold a paid office, but in 1565 successfully stood for re-election and was regularly re-elected for further terms thereafter. From 1583 to 1587 he was captain of a company of the watch. He died in Cologne on 23 March 1597.

== Writings ==
The writings of Hermann von Weinsberg comprise a family history, Das boich Weinsberg, and a three-volume autobiography consisting of the retrospective Liber Juventutis (1518–1578) and the more diaristic Liber Senectutis (1578–1588) and Liber Decrepitudinis (1588–1597). These manuscripts were discovered in the archives during the 19th century, and various selections have since been published under the title Das Buch Weinsberg (1886, 1898, 1926, 1961). A full digital edition is currently under way at the University of Bonn.

== Studies ==
- Manfred Groten, Hermann Weinsberg (1518-1597): Kölner Bürger und Ratsherr. Studien zu Leben und Werk (SH-Verlag, 2005)
