= Leonhard Ennen =

German theologian, historian and archivist

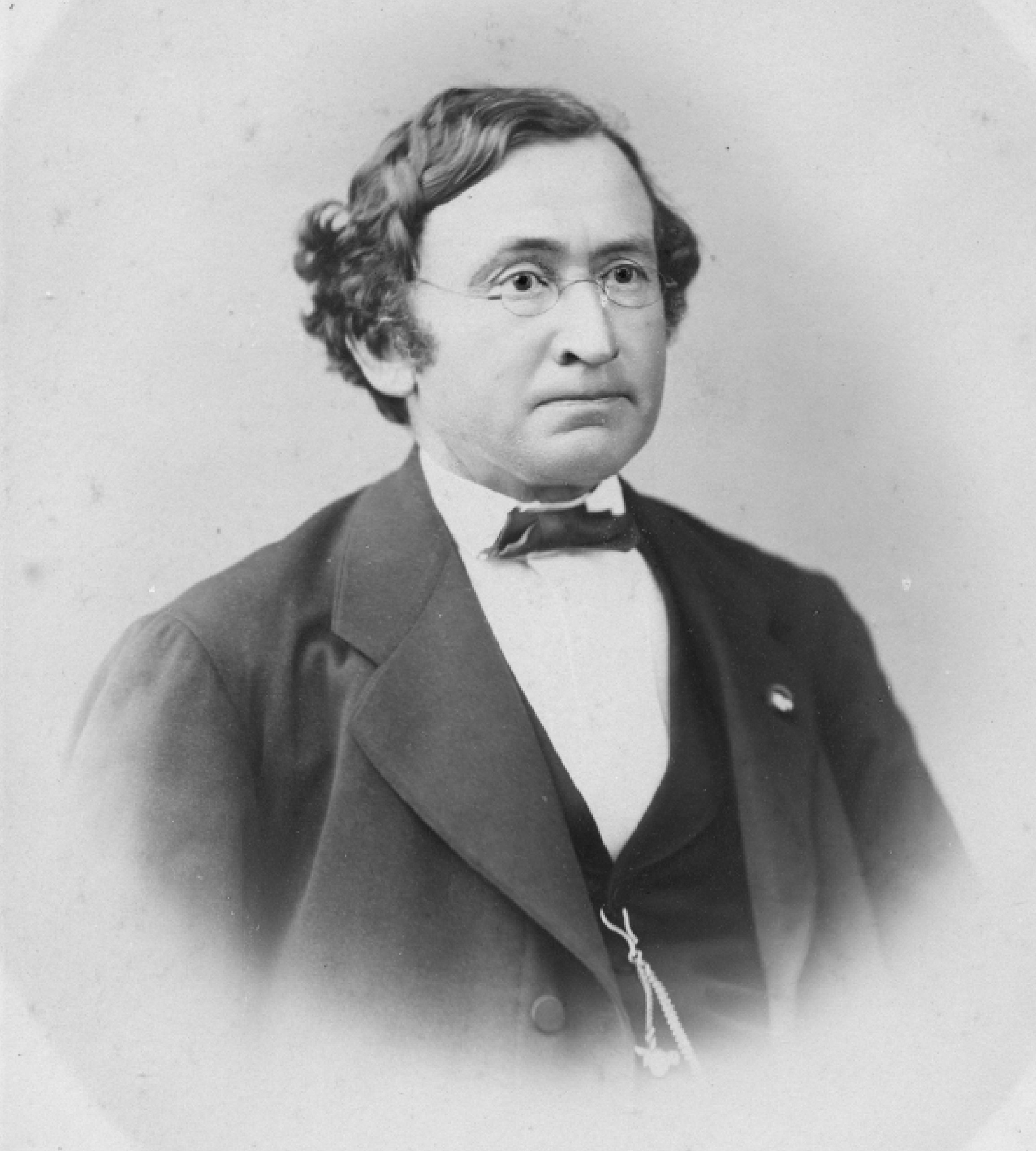
- Born: Leonhard Ennen, Leonard Ennen; 5 March 1820; Schleiden, Euskirchen, Germany
- Died: 14 June 1880 (aged 60); Cologne
- Education: University of Münster; University of Bonn
- Occupations: Archivist, Historian
- Writing career
- Language: German
- Period: 19th century
- Genre: History
- Subjects: Archdiocese of Cologne; Electorate of Cologne; City of Cologne
- Notable works: Geschichte der Stadt Köln (1862–1879) (5 volumes); Quellen zur Geschichte der Stadt Köln (1880–1889)

Leonhard Ennen, also spelled Leonard Ennen, (5 March 1820 – 14 June 1880) was a German theologian, historian and archivist born in Schleiden, in the Eifel region of modern-day Germany. He is remembered for his writings on the history of Cologne.

== Family and education ==
Leonhard Ennen's parents were simple farmers, the equivalent of sharecroppers in German agricultural society. From 1841 to 1844 he studied theology and philosophy at the University of Münster and the University of Bonn. Following his ordination, he served as vicar and head of the upper Stadtschule, city school, in Königswinter am Rhein, and he remained in this position from 1845 to 1857.

== Archive development ==
While teaching at the school, he became interested in the history of Cologne. In 1849 his Geschichte der Reformation im Bereiche der alten Erzdiözese Köln appeared, in which he examined the impact of the Reformation on the archdiocese of Cologne. He followed this with his Der spanische Erbfolgekrieg und der Churfürst Joseph Clemens von Köln, a study of the War of the Spanish Succession and the role the Elector Joseph Clemens played in this contest, published in 1851. His superiors at the education ministry sent him to Paris, to study archive development and management: the fruit of this study, Frankreich und der Niederrhein, oder Geschichte von Stadt und Kurstaat Köln seit dem 30jährigen Kriege bis zur französischen Occupation, appeared in two volumes in 1855 and 1856. This study of France's relationship with the states of the lower Rhine during the Thirty Years War attracted attention to his talents as an historian, and on 1 August 1857 he was appointed director of the Historisches Archiv der Stadt Köln (Historical Archive of the City of Cologne).

With other historians, notably Anton Fahne (1805–1883), he helped to found the Historischen Verein für den Niederrhein (Historical Society of the Lower Rhine) in 1854, and served as the society's first secretary. He continued to identify, categorize, and publish volumes on the sources and documents of the history of Cologne. He died in Cologne on 14 July 1880.

== Selected publications ==
- Geschichte der Reformation im Bereich der alten Erzdiözese (History of the Reformation in the Domain of the Ancient Archdiocese of Cologne), 1847
- Frankreich und der Niederrhein (France and the Lower Rhine); two volumes, 1856
- Zeitbilder aus der neuern Geschichte der Stadt Köln, mit besonderer Beziehung auf Ferdinand Franz Wallraf (Pictures from the Newer History of the City of Cologne, with special reference to Ferdinand Franz Wallraf), 1857
- Quellen zur Geschichte der Stadt Köln (Sources for the History of the City of Cologne); volumes 1–6, 1850–79
- Geschichte der Stadt Köln (History of the City of Cologne); five volumes, 1863–75
- Bilder vom alten Köln: Stadtansichten d. 15. bis 18. Jahrhundert u. Beschreibung d. Zustände vom Mittelalter bis nach d. Franzosenzeit (Pictures of old Cologne: City Views from the 15th to 18th century, etc.)
