= Krummbach (Dreisam) =

River in Germany

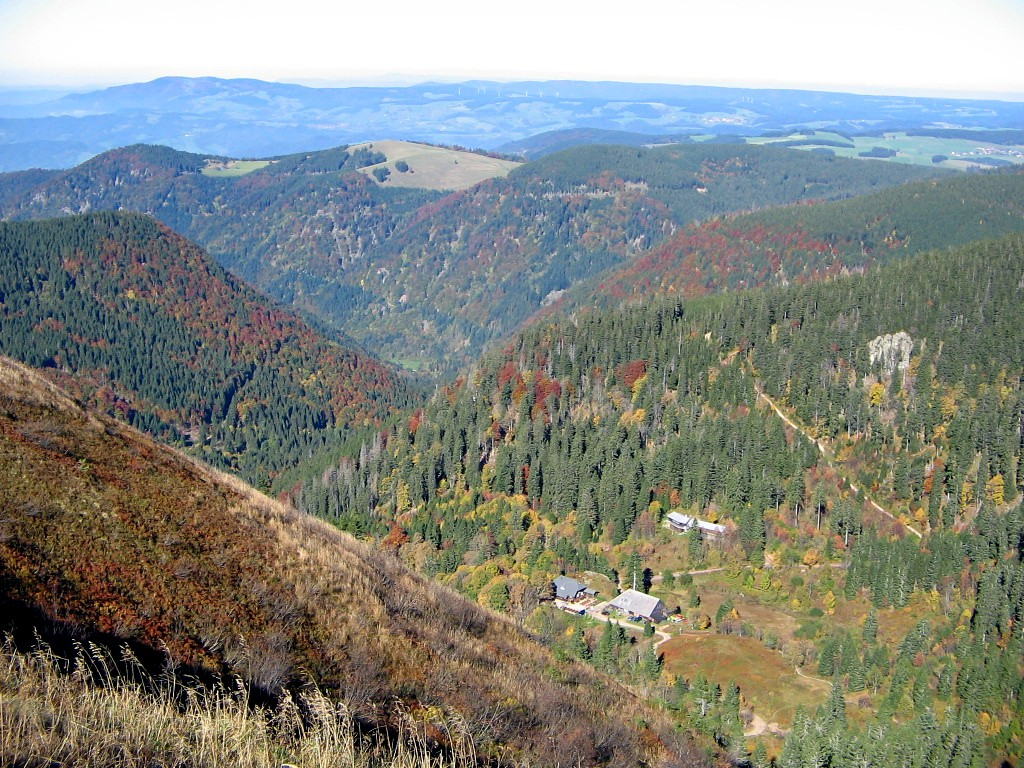
- The upper Zastler valley seen from the Feldberg

Location
- Country: Germany
- State: Baden-Württemberg
- Reference no.: DE: 2338832

Physical characteristics
- Source
  - location: Into the Zastler Loch at Feldberg
  - coordinates: 47°52′27″N 8°00′52″E
  - elevation: ca. 1,445 m above sea level (NN)
- Mouth
  - location: into the Dreisam
  - coordinates: 47°58′48″N 7°55′05″E
  - elevation: ca. 329 m above sea level (NN)
- Length: 17.0 km (10.6 mi)
- Basin size: 30.99 km^{2}
- Discharge
  - location: at its mouth
  - average: 1.0 m^{3}/s

Basin features
- Progression: Dreisam→ Elz→ Rhine→ North Sea
- Landmarks: Villages: Oberried, Kirchzarten
- Tributaries
  - left: Stollenbach
  - right: Weilersbächle

The Krummbach is a left tributary of the Dreisam in the Southern Black Forest east of Freiburg im Breisgau in the German state of Baden-Württemberg. It is just under 17 kilometres long, In its upper reaches it is better known as the Zastlerbach; in its middle course it is also known as the Osterbach.
