= Barbarastollen underground archive =

German cultural archive in Baden-Württemberg

Coordinates: 47°55′23″N 7°56′09″E

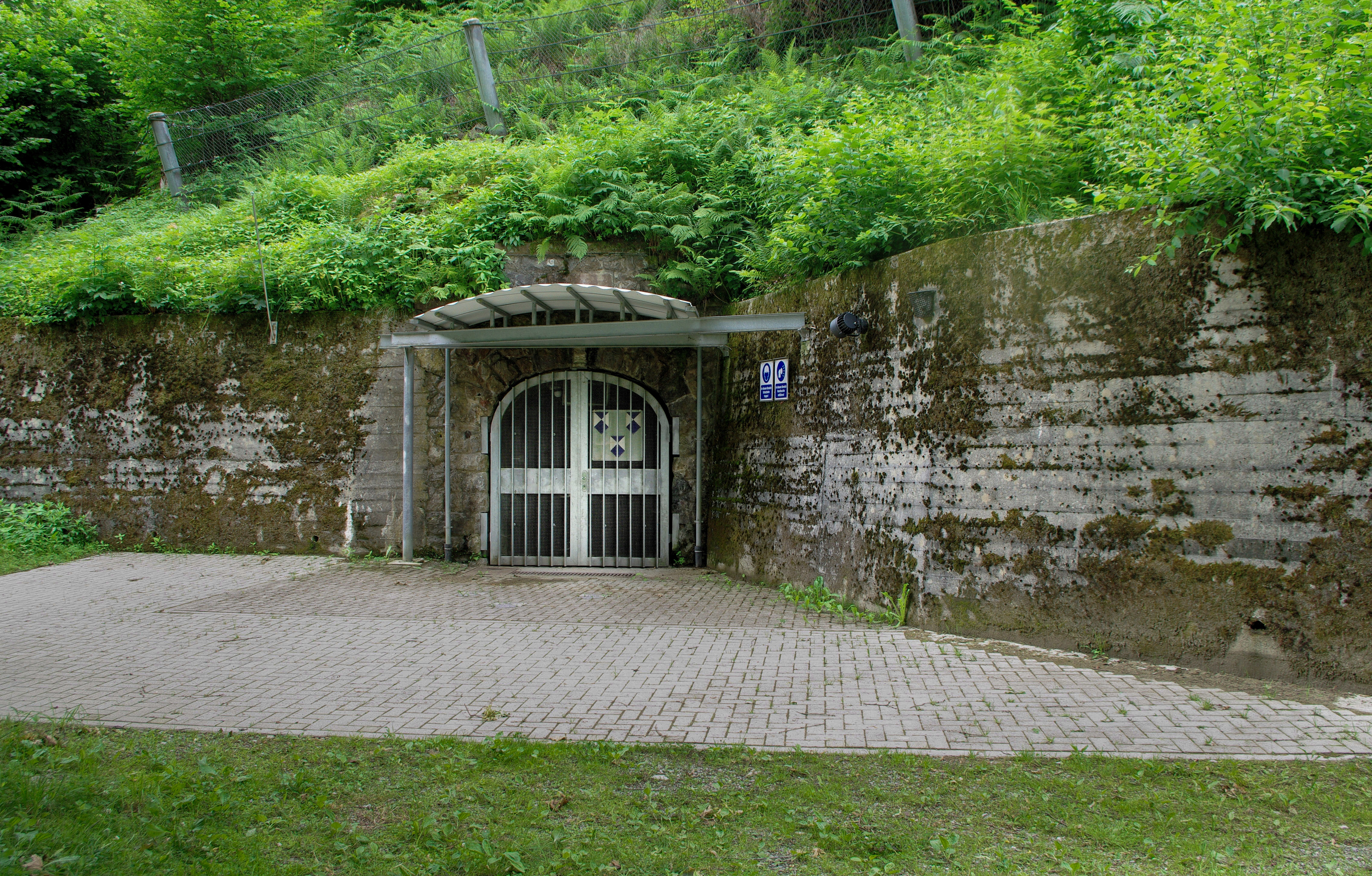
Entrance to the archive

Emblem for cultural property under special protection

The Barbarastollen underground archive is an underground archive intended to preserve Germany’s cultural heritage from man-made or natural disaster. The Barbarastollen is located in a disused mine near Freiburg im Breisgau, Baden-Württemberg, Germany. As of 2025 it holds microfilms over 1.3 billion images from German archives and museums.

Among the documents stored here in microfilm facsimile are:

- treaty text of the Peace of Westphalia
- Bull by Pope Leo X threatening Martin Luther with excommunication
- coronation document of Otto I
- documents of Johann Wolfgang von Goethe
- original building plans for Cologne Cathedral.
- German Basic Law

The Barbarastollen tunnel is protected by the Hague Convention for the Protection of Cultural Property in the Event of Armed Conflict of UNESCO. It is a "refuge intended to shelter, in the event of armed conflict, the movable cultural property" according to article 1 sub-paragraph b. It is furthermore the only cultural property in Germany under special protection according to Chapter II of the convention, and one of only five such sites worldwide, the others being the Vatican City and three refuges in the Netherlands. It is named after Saint Barbara. The entire complex is buried under 400 meters of rock. It is intended to survive a nuclear war. It is estimated that its contents should survive for at least 500 years without any serious damage.
