= Stollenbach (Black Forest) =

Mountain in Baden-Württemberg, Germany

Coordinates: 47°54′11″N 7°58′50″E

Geography
- Location: Baden-Württemberg, Germany

Stollenbach is a mountain of the Black Forest, Baden-Württemberg, Germany.
