= Oberried, Baden-Württemberg =

Oberried
- Municipality
- Coat of arms

- Location of Oberried within Breisgau-Hochschwarzwald district
- Interactive map of Oberried
- Location within Germany Location within Baden-Württemberg
- Coordinates: 47°55′55″N 7°56′50″E
- Country: Germany
- State: Baden-Württemberg
- Admin. region: Freiburg
- District: Breisgau-Hochschwarzwald
- Subdivisions: 4

Government
  - Mayor (2021–29): Klaus Vosberg (CDU)

Area
  - Total: 66.32 km^{2} (25.61 sq mi)
- Elevation: 460 m (1,510 ft)

Population (2025-12-31)
  - Total: 2,755
  - Density: 41.54/km^{2} (107.6/sq mi)
- Time zone: UTC+01:00 (CET)
  - Summer (DST): UTC+02:00 (CEST)
- Postal codes: 79254
- Dialling codes: 07661
- Vehicle registration: FR
- Website: www.oberried.de

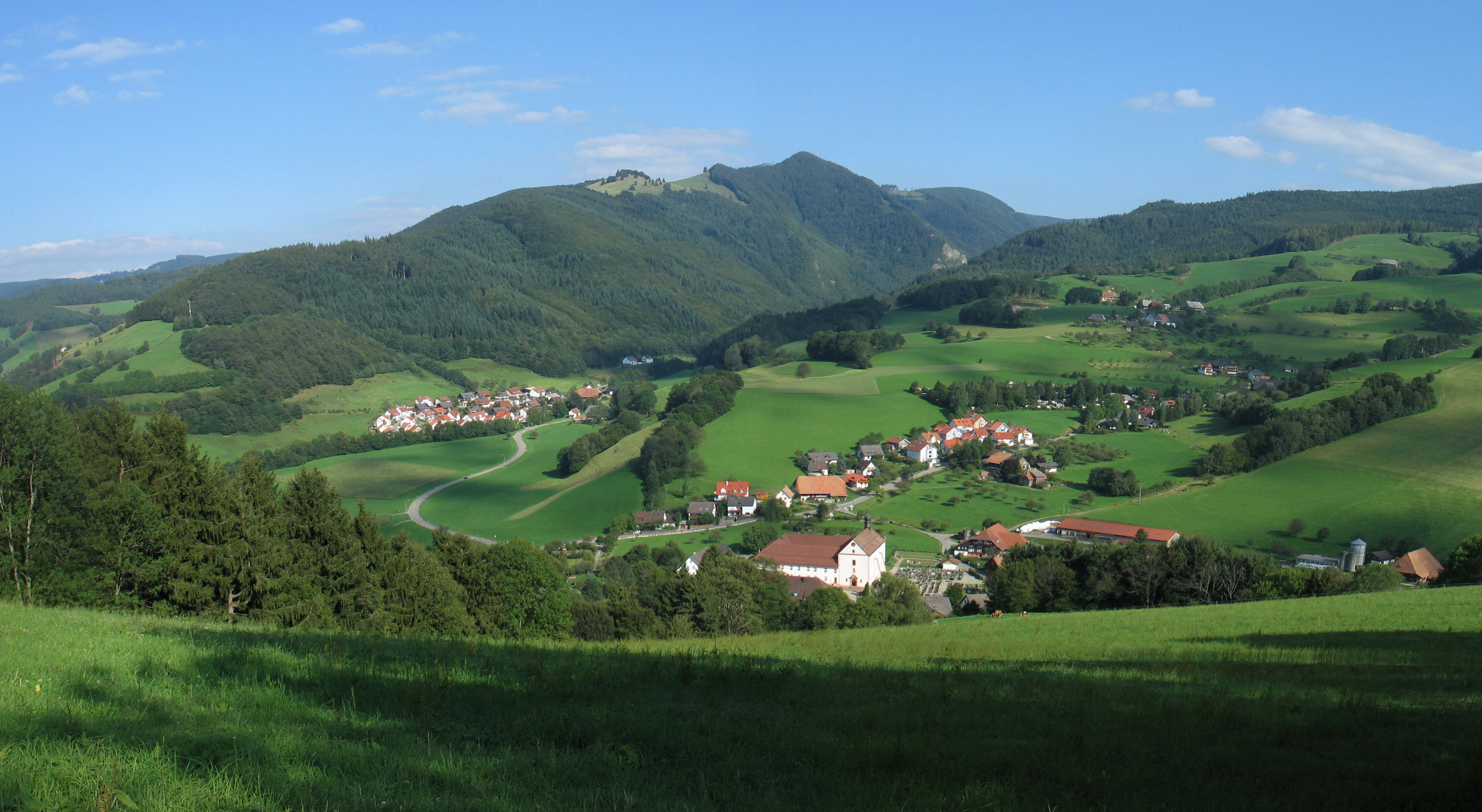
View from Goldberg on the village Oberried and into the Dreisam Valley

Oberried is a town in the district of Breisgau-Hochschwarzwald in Baden-Württemberg in southern Germany.

Oberried is home to the Barbarastollen caves, the central safekeeping archive of Germany. The Barbarastollen holds microfilms with millions of images from German archives and museums.

== Demographics ==
Population development:

Year	Inhabitants
1990	2,519
2001	2,791
2011	2,870
2021	2,833
