= Stübenwasen =

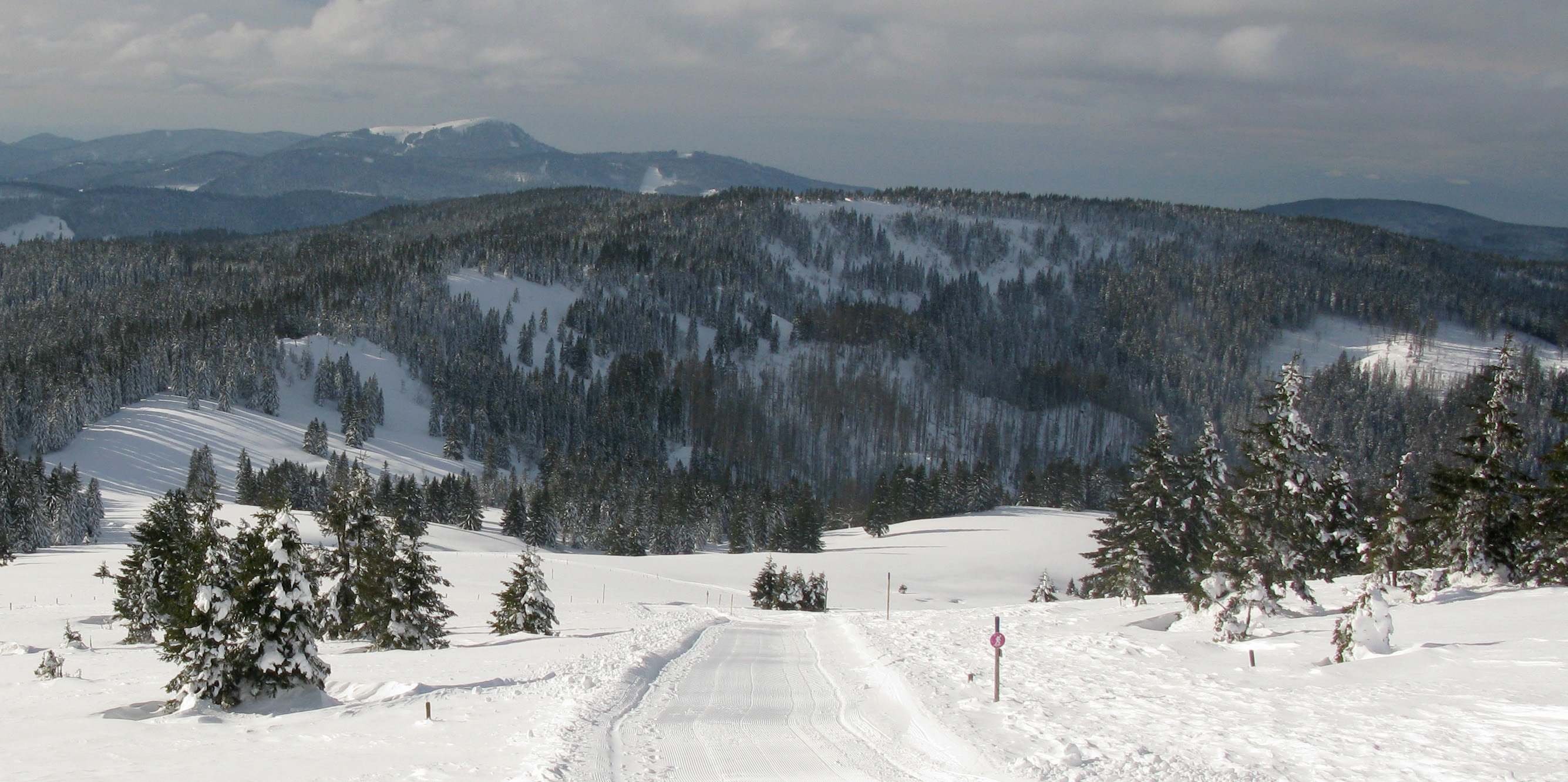
- The Stübenwasen seen from the Feldberg with the Belchen in the background

Highest point
- Elevation: 1,386 m above sea level (NHN) (4,547 ft)
- Coordinates: 47°52′03″N 7°58′17″E

Geography
- Location within Baden-Württemberg
- Location: Baden-Württemberg, Germany
- Parent range: Black Forest

The Stübenwasen (1,386 m above sea level (NHN)) is the sixth highest mountain in the Black Forest after the Feldberg (1,493 m above NHN), Baldenweger Buck (1,461 m above NHN), Seebuck (1,448 m above NHN), Herzogenhorn (1,415 m above NHN) and the Belchen (1,414 m above NHN). It is the highest point on the ridge between Schauinsland and Feldberg and is only separated from the latter by a wide saddle. To the north is the St. Wilhelm Valley, to the south the Wiesental with Todtnau and Todtnauberg.

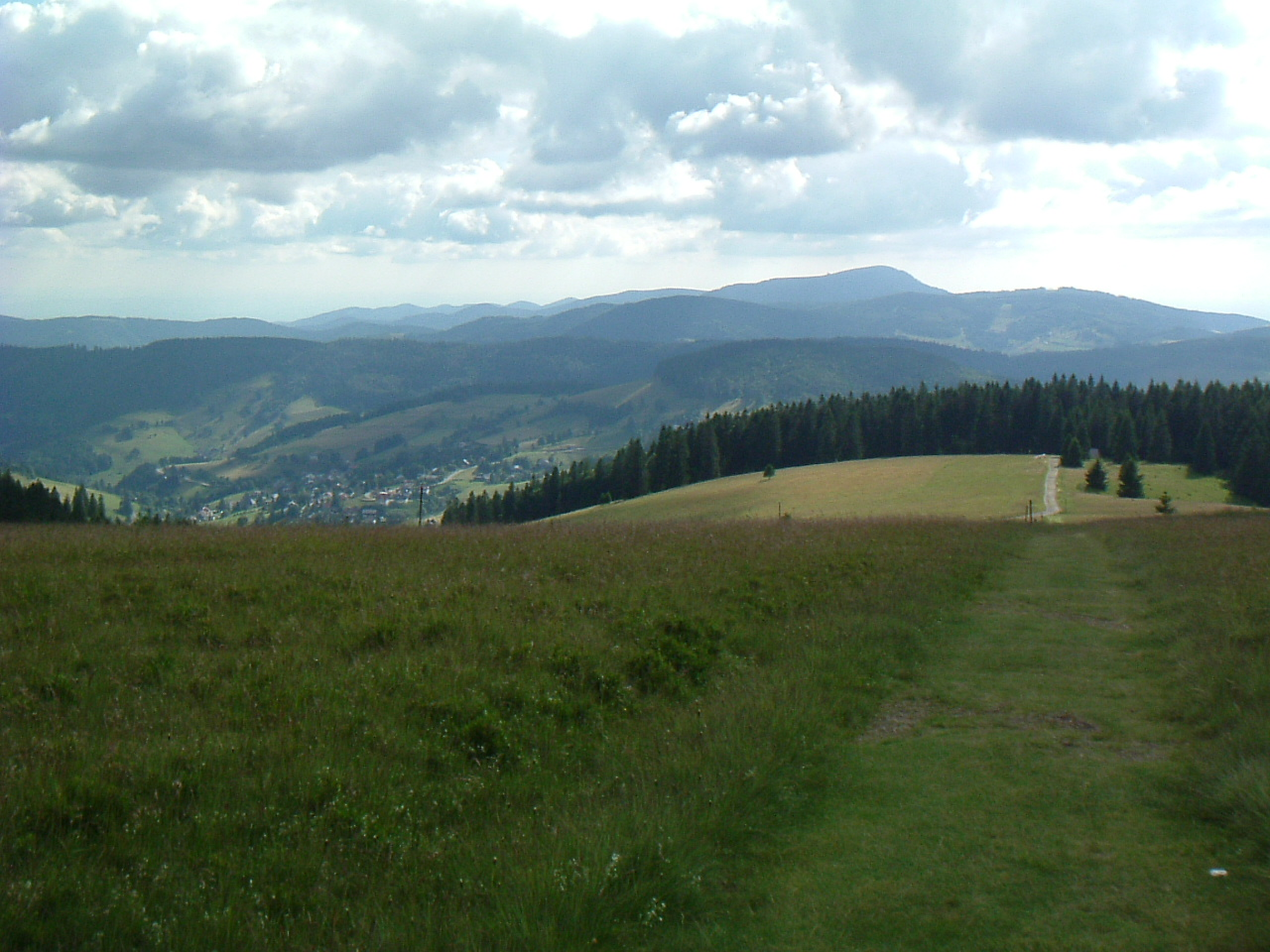
View from the Stübenwasen of Todtnauberg and the Belchen

== Vegetation and use ==
The summit of the Stübenwasen is not wooded. The sudden transitions to forest show, however, that this is not a natural treeline. The Stübenwasen would not be treeless just on account of its height; the treeline here, about 100 kilometres north of the nearest north Alpine peak could be expected to lie at about 1,650–1,700 m. The highlands are used in summer as cattle pasture, in winter as a ski area.

== Tourism ==
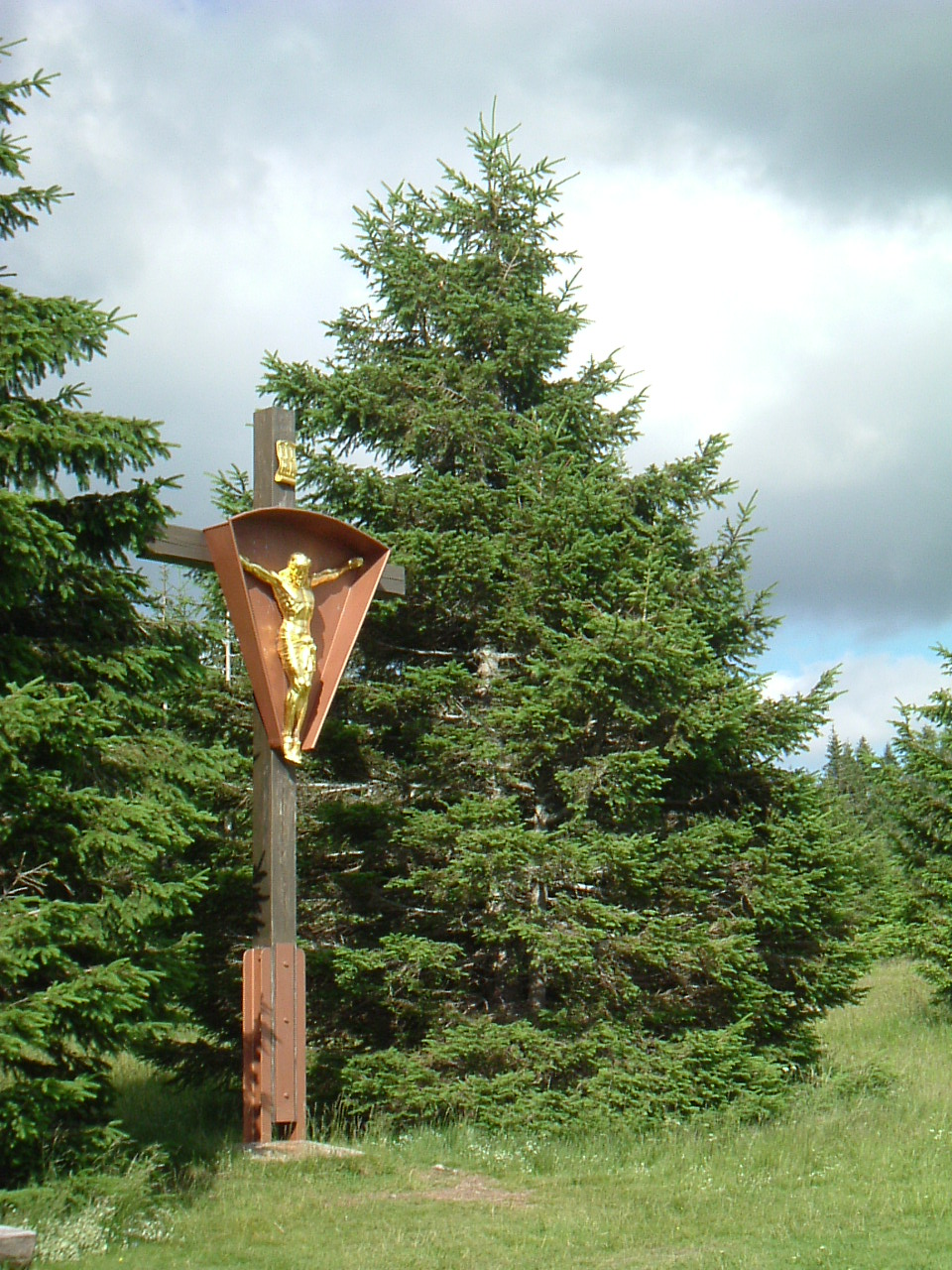
The Stübenwasen cross

The Stübenwasen is thus well developed for tourism, although it is not accessible by car, like for example the Feldberg or the Kandel. West of the summit is an inn, the Berggasthaus Stübenwasen (1,270 m), built in 1935. It is accessible in summer on the footpath between Feldberg and Notschrei, and in winter on the Stübenwasenspur. In addition lifts run from Todtnauberg up the Stübenwasen, the Stübenwasen Lift (1,000 m long, from 1,100 m to 1,350 m) and the Stübenwasen Summit Lift (Gipfellift) (400 m long, from 1,330 m to 1,370 m).
