= Feldsee =

Lake in Baden-Württemberg, Germany

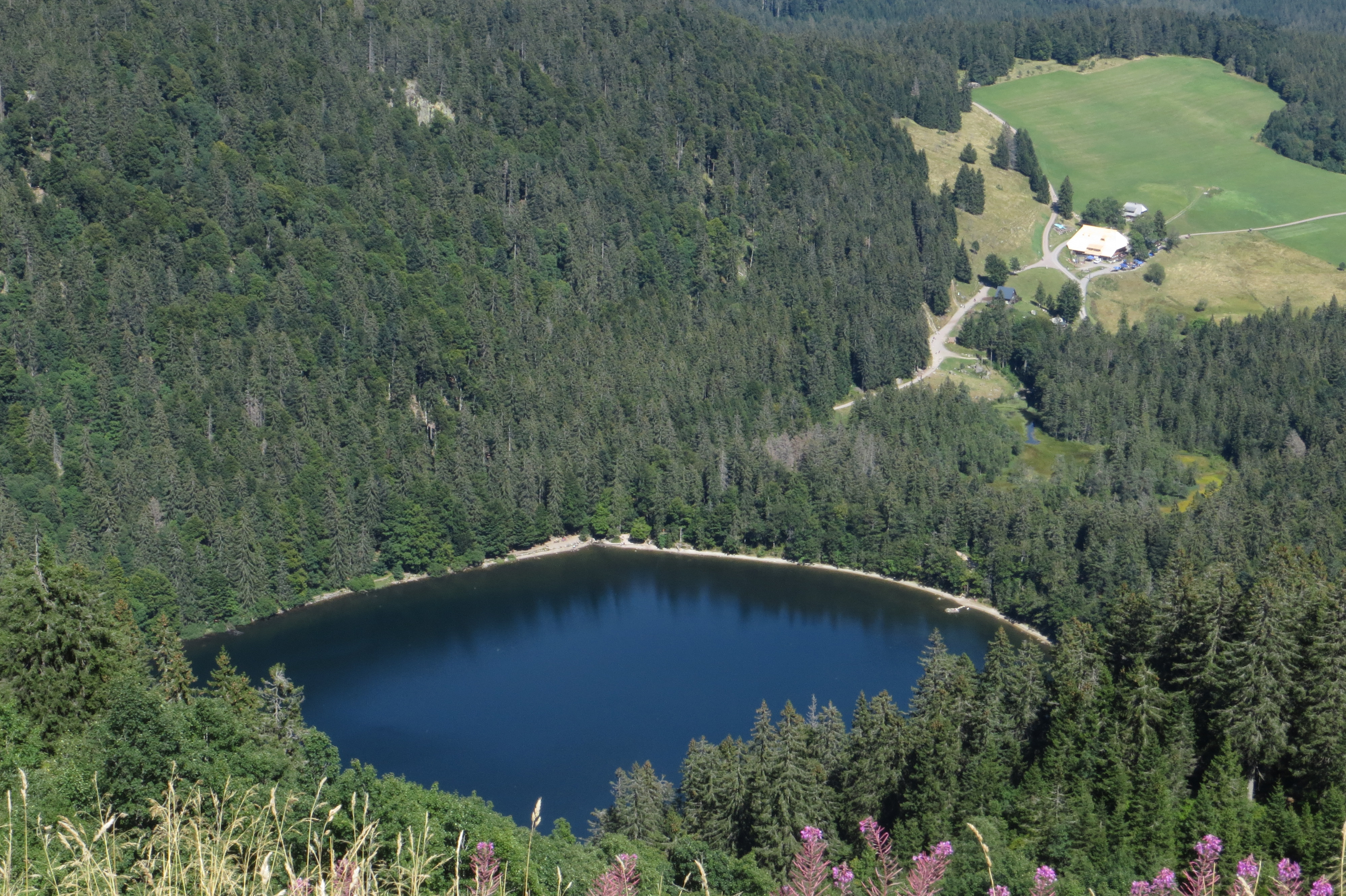
- The Feldsee seen from the area of the Bismarck monument on the Seebuck

- Location within Baden-Württemberg
- Location: Baden-Württemberg
- Coordinates: 47.87028°N 8.03250°E
- Primary inflows: Seebach
- Primary outflows: Seebach
- Max. length: 0.35 km (0.22 mi)
- Max. width: 0.36 km (0.22 mi)
- Surface area: 9.75 ha (24.1 acres)
- Max. depth: 32 m (105 ft)
- Shore length^{1}: 2.5 km (1.6 mi)
- Surface elevation: 1,109 m (3,638 ft)
- ^{1} Shore length is not a well-defined measure.

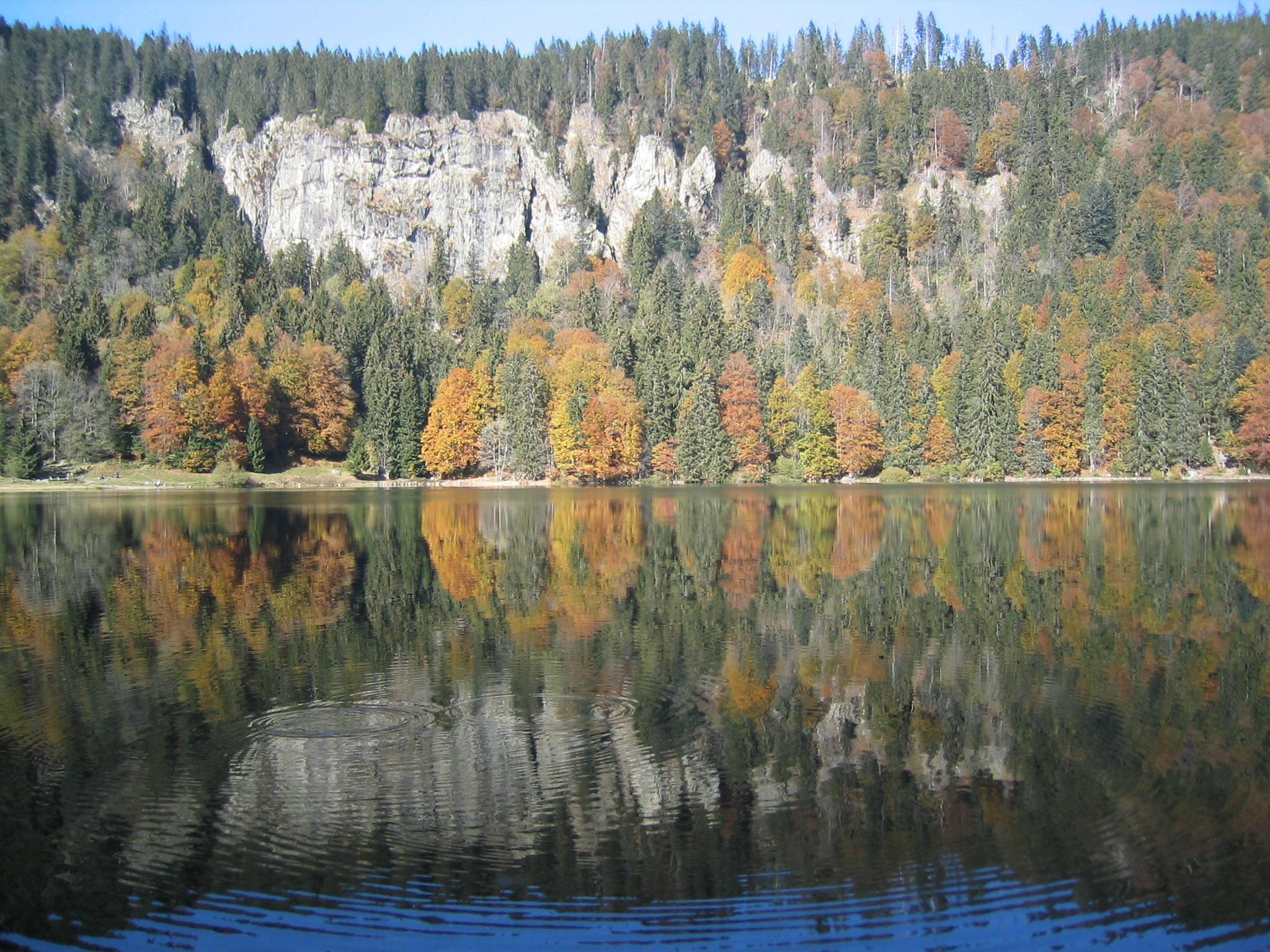
View of the Feldsee in autumn

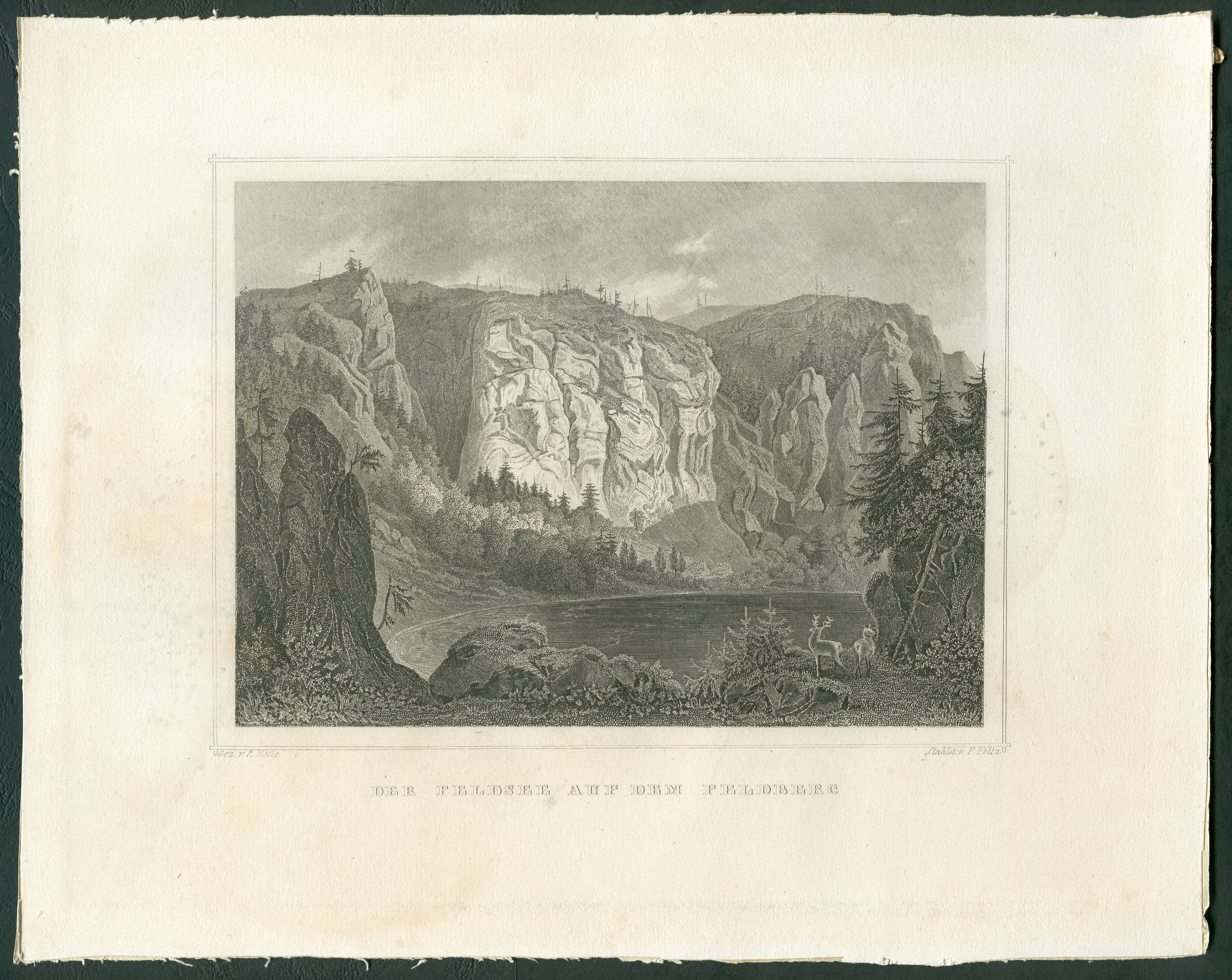
Around 1850: Der Feldsee auf dem Feldberg; steel engraving by F. Foltz based on a drawing by R. Höfle

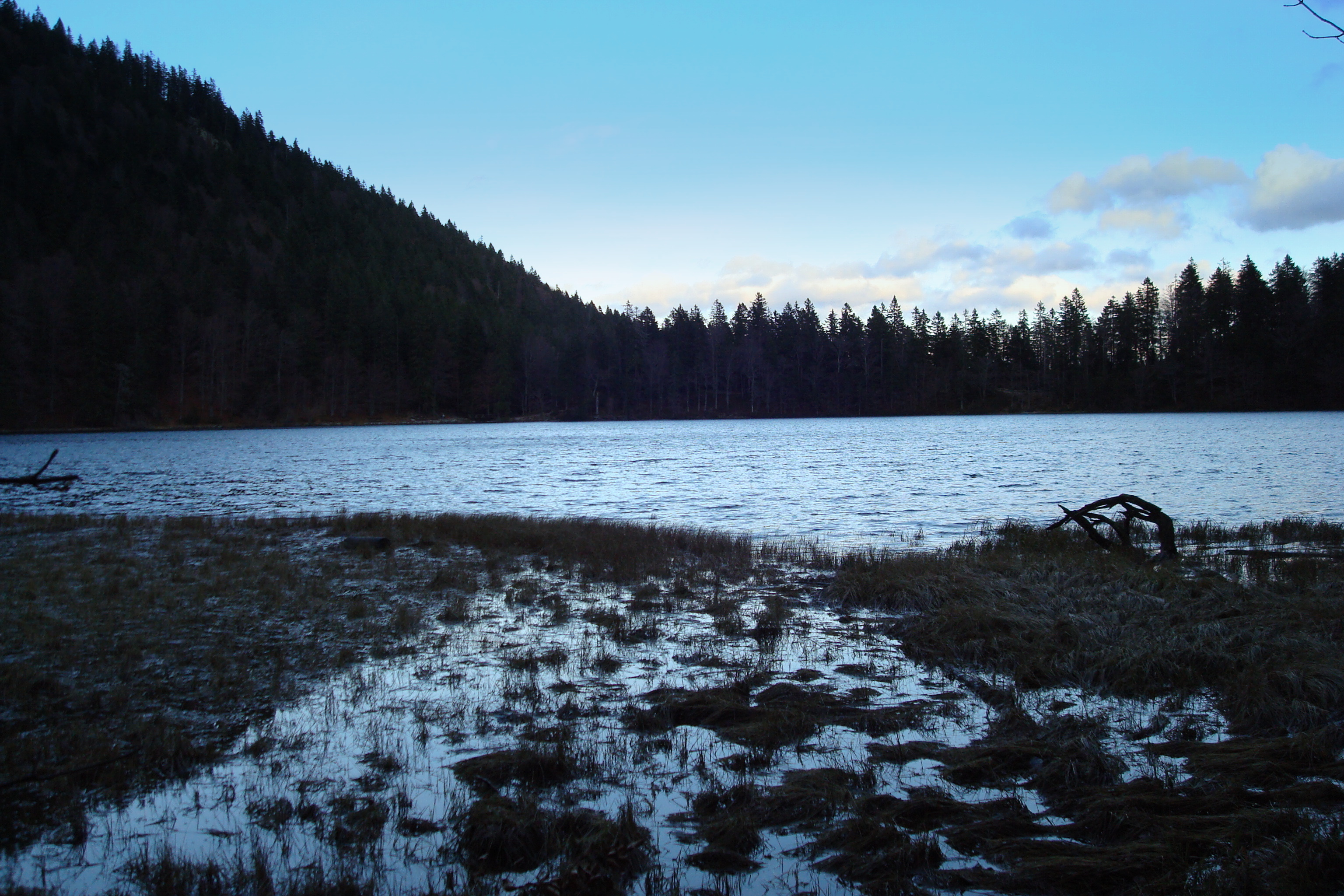
View over the Feldsee from west to east on a late November afternoon

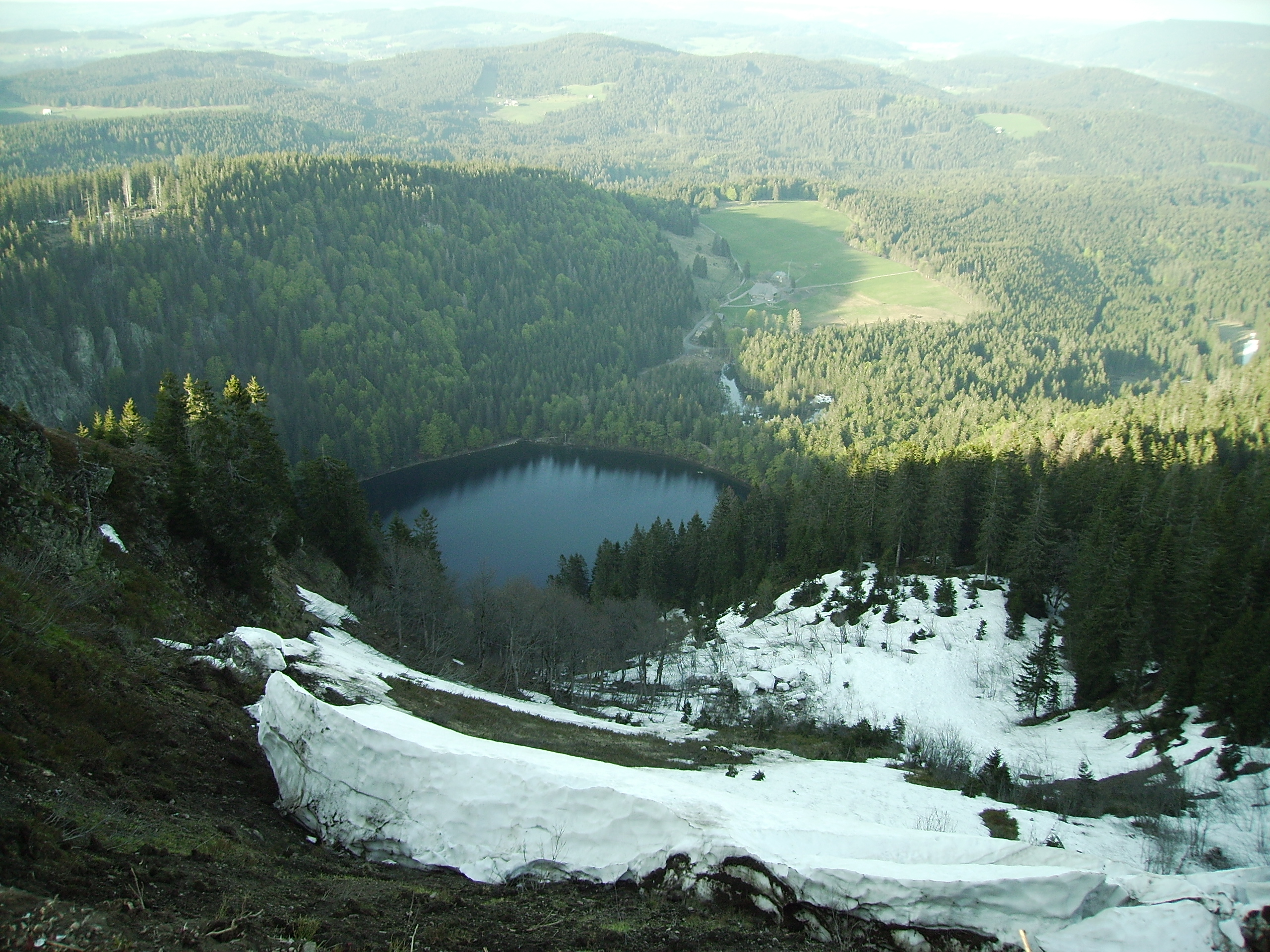
The Feldsee cirque seen from the Seebuck

The Feldsee (also Feldbergsee) is a lake in southern Baden-Württemberg at the foot of the Feldberg east of Freiburg im Breisgau in Germany. It is part of the Southern Black Forest Nature Park.

== Geology and earth history ==
The Feldsee is a tarn, around 97,500 m^{2} in area and up to 32 metres deep. It was formed by glaciers of the last ice age. The largest tarn in the Black Forest, it is hemmed in on three sides by steep mountainsides up to 300 metres high. It is almost circular and has a diameter of between 350 and 370 metres. This area of highland at a height of 1,100 m, which is open to the northeast, enabled it to amass and retain the huge quantities of snow that were the cause of this armchair-shaped terrain with its steep back face, level floor and embankment of moraine at the front. The lake formed after the melting of the ice sheet behind the lines of heaped-up glacial debris. The Seebach stream, which rises between the Feldberg and Seebuck in the Grüble, flows through the Feldsee, tumbling over the Feldsee Waterfall on the wall of the cirque, eventually becoming the Gutach at the far side of the Titisee. For several hundred thousand years this was the upper course of the ancient Danube (Urdonau), which flowed into the present-day Danube near Immendingen and, for the last several ten thousand years has formed a headstream of the Wutach, which flows into the Rhine.

Below the Feldsee, between the heaps of moraine, used to be another, smaller lake that, through the formation of peat has silted up to become the present-day, botanically valuable bog of Feldseemoor.

== Nature conservation ==
Currently there is a general ban on bathing in the Feldsee. This is in order to protect a rare underwater fern, the spiny quillwort (Isoetes echinospora), that thrives in water 1–2 metres deep and only occurs in Germany in the Feldsee and Lake Titisee. This plant grows in lakes with cool, very clear water that are low in nutrients. Around the Feldsee is a so-called Bannwald. This mixed forest is also protected and is allowed to grow naturally. It has been protected since 1937 and is the oldest nature reserve in Baden-Württemberg. The Feldsee Crags (Feldseefelsen) are out of bounds to climbers. The Feldberg rangers enforce these rules strictly. There are rare plants here like the alpine sow-thistle, Turk's cap lily, wolfsbane and sundew.

Recently, a new species of bacteria was discovered in the lake and subsequently scientifically described. This new species, Polynucleobacter campilacus is named after the lake. Currently, it is not known, if this species is endemic to the lake or possesses a geographically broader distribution. P. campilacus is remarkable because of its relatively small genome size.

== Access ==
There are no roads to the Feldsee; it can only be accessed on foot or by bicycle. The nearest car parks are 3–4 km away in Feldberg-Bärental (Wanderparkplatz Kunzenmoos), and on the Feldberg. The Feldsee is easily reached by bicycle from Alpersbach via the Rinken. The lake can be circumnavigated on a well-prepared path. 490 metres east of the Feldsee is the 300-year-old Raimartihof inn.

== Literature ==
- Der Feldberg im Schwarzwald. Subalpine Insel im Mittelgebirge; mit Beiträgen von A. Bogenrieder, E. Liehl, E. Oberdorfer, G. Osche, W. Wimmenauer et al. (Photography: H. & K. Rasbach). – publ.: Landesanstalt für Umweltschutz Baden-Württemberg, Karlsruhe, 1982, (vergr.)
- Der Schwarzwald. Beiträge zur Landeskunde; eds.: E. Liehl & W. D. Sick – 2nd edn., Verlag Konkordia, Bühl 1982, (vergr.)
- August Vetter: Feldberg im Schwarzwald, Selbstverlag der Gemeinde Feldberg (Schwarzwald), 1982/1996
