= Baldenweger Buck =

Mountain in Germany

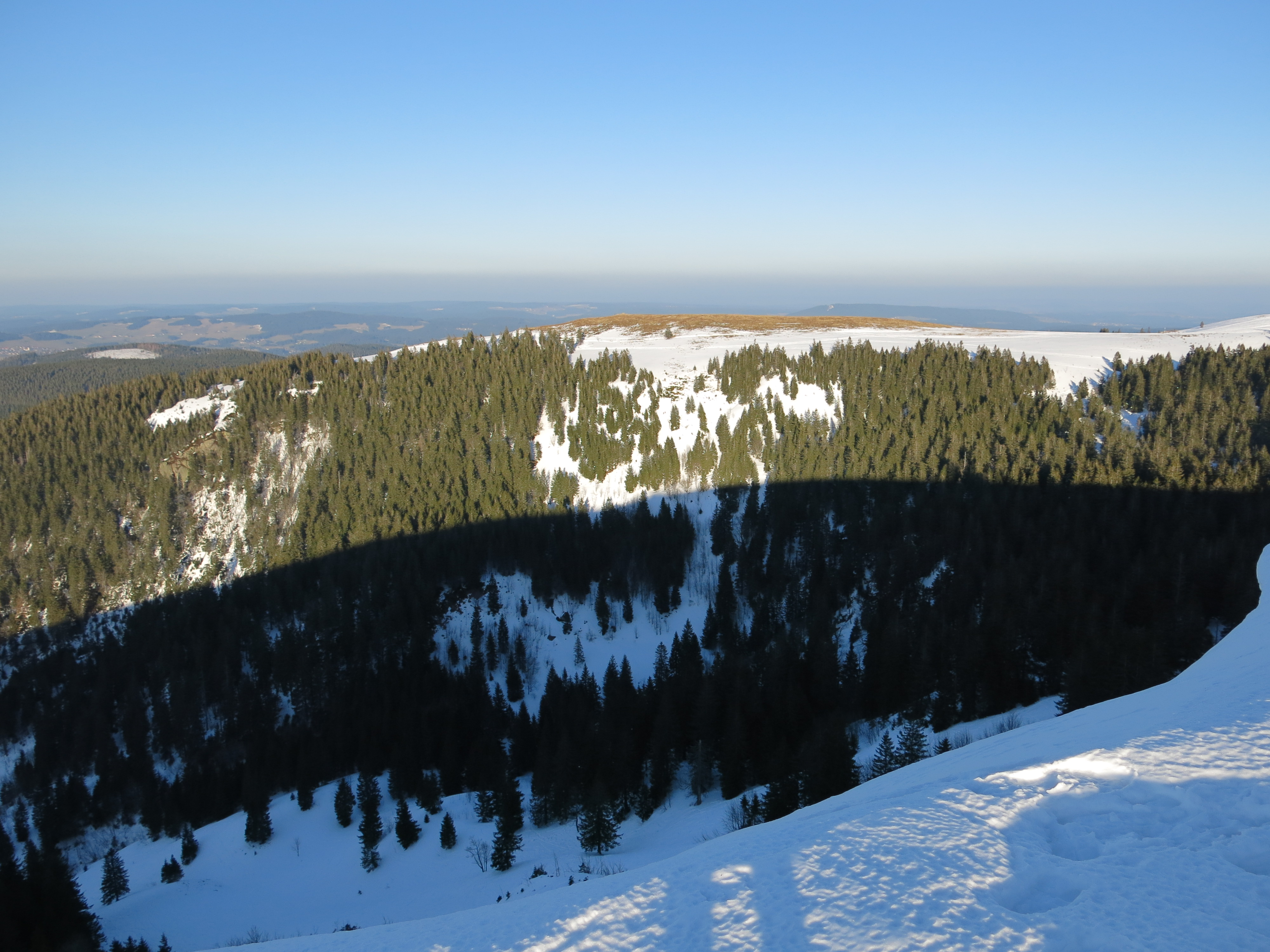
- The Baldenweger Buck from the summit of the Feldberg

Highest point
- Elevation: 1,460.5 m above sea level (NHN) (4,792 ft)
- Prominence: 11 m (36 ft)
- Parent peak: Feldberg (line parent)
- Isolation: 0.41 km (0.25 mi) to Feldberg
- Coordinates: 47°52′36″N 8°00′56″E

Geography
- Location within Baden-Württemberg
- Location: Baden-Württemberg, Germany
- Parent range: Black Forest

The Baldenweger Buck is a subordinate elevation of Feldberg, 1,460.5 m above sea level (NHN), high, in the Black Forest around 900 metres northeast of the Feldberg main peak.

The bare ridge drops steeply towards the west, north and east into the surrounding valleys of the Zastlerbach and Seebach. Only towards the south does it transition into a shallow saddle (1,450 m) that links the Baldenweger Buck with the Feldberg top.

With its low isolation of 410 metres and a prominence of only 11 metres to the Feldberg, the Baldenweger Buck is not considered to be an independent eminence, but a subordinate elevation of the Feldberg. As a result, the second highest summit in the Black Forest is usually seen as the lower, but more prominent, Seebuck.

A waymarked footpath runs over the Baldenweger Buck from the Rinken via the Baldenweger Hut to the summit of the Feldberg.
