= Notschrei Skiing Trail =

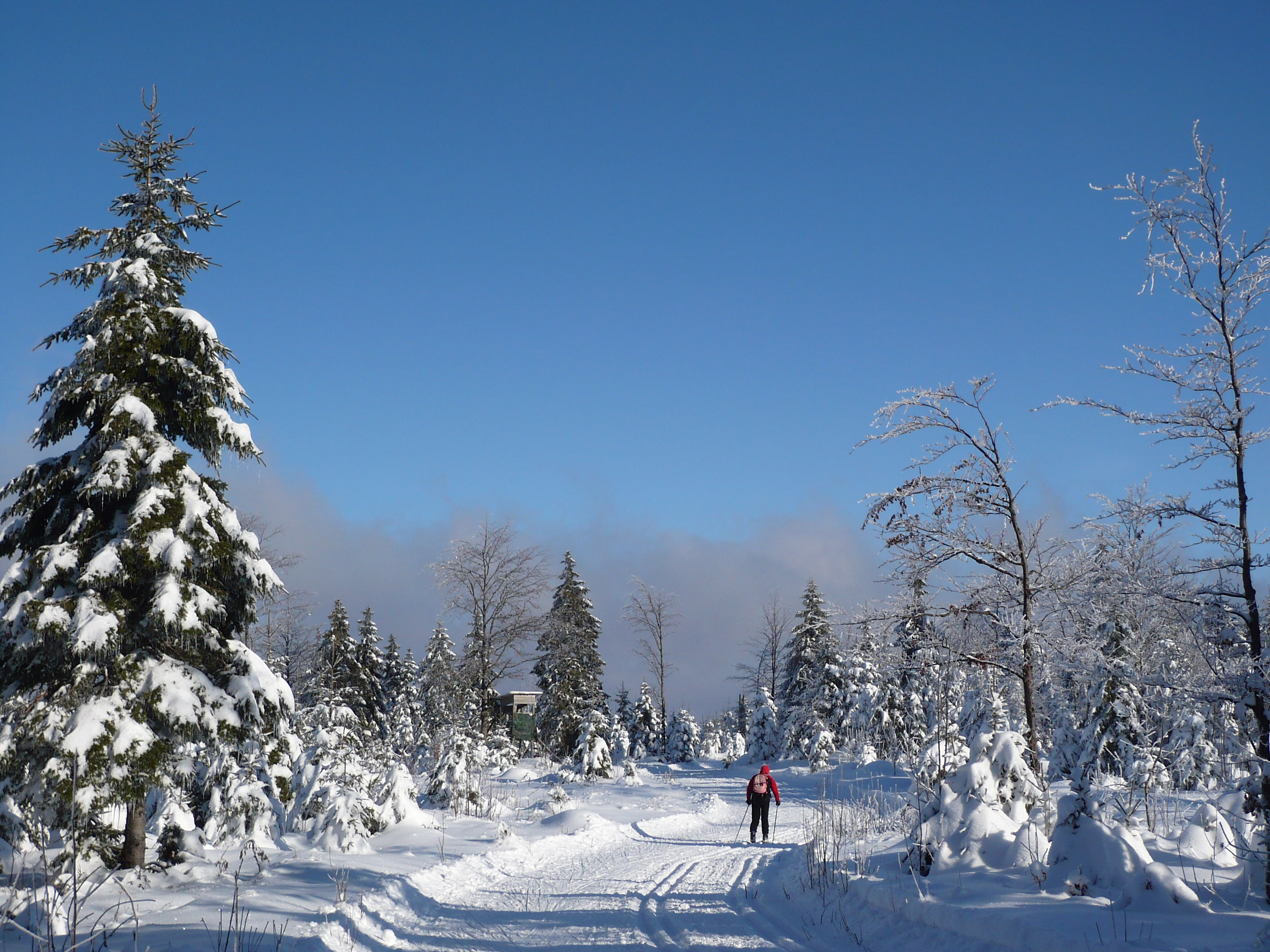
Schauinsland Trail

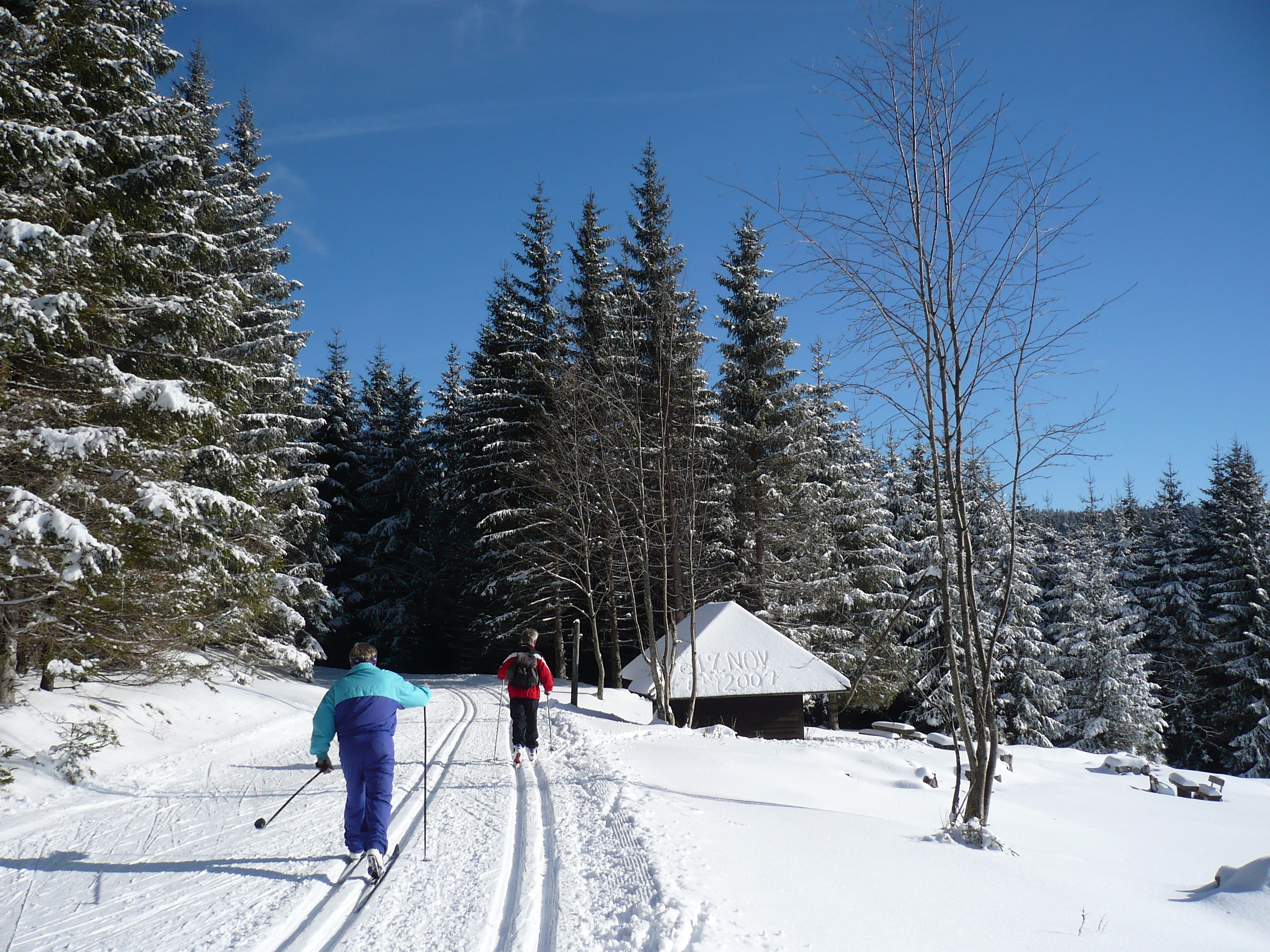
Stübenwasen Trail

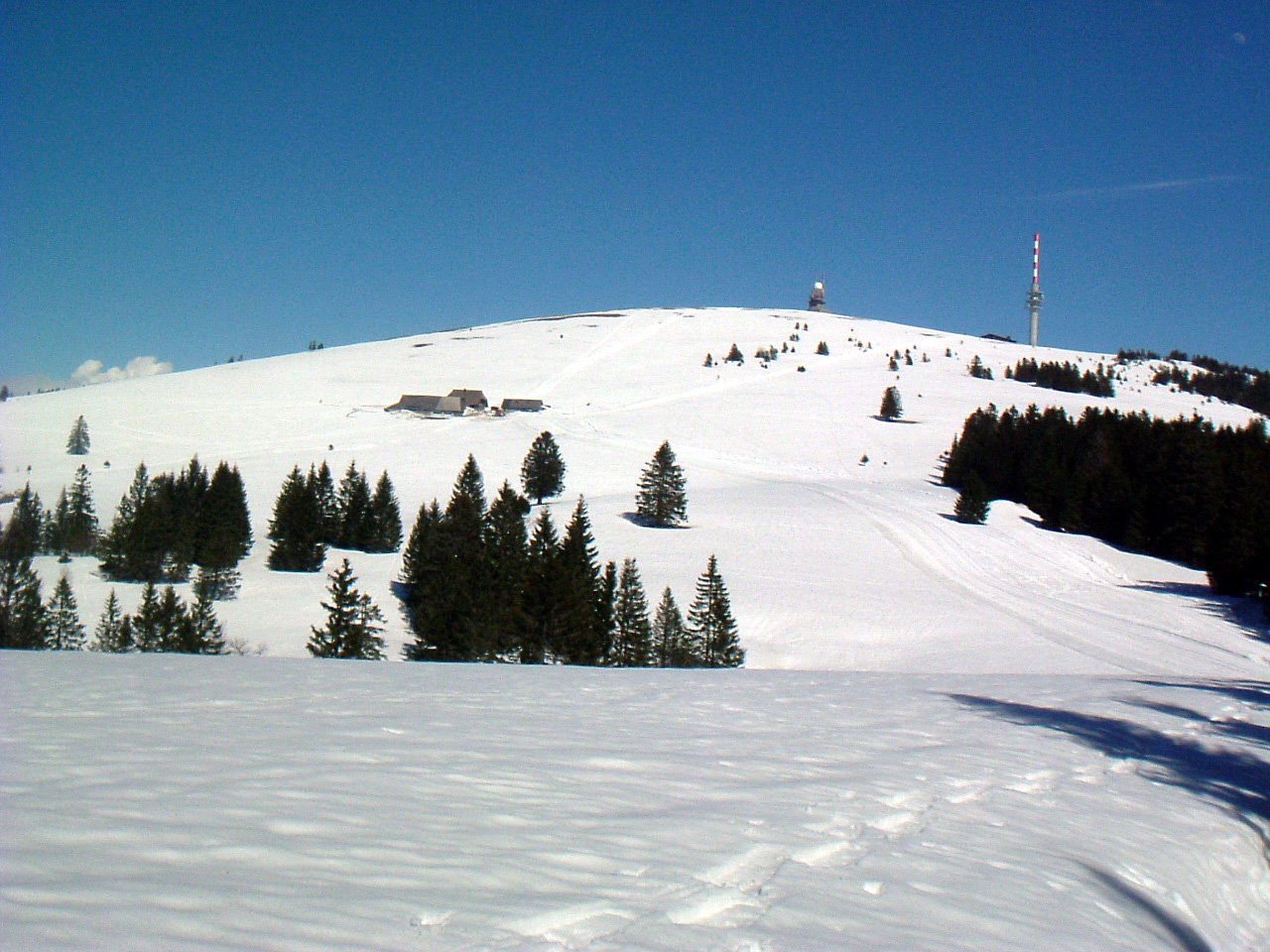
View on the Feldberg and St. Wilhelmer Hütte

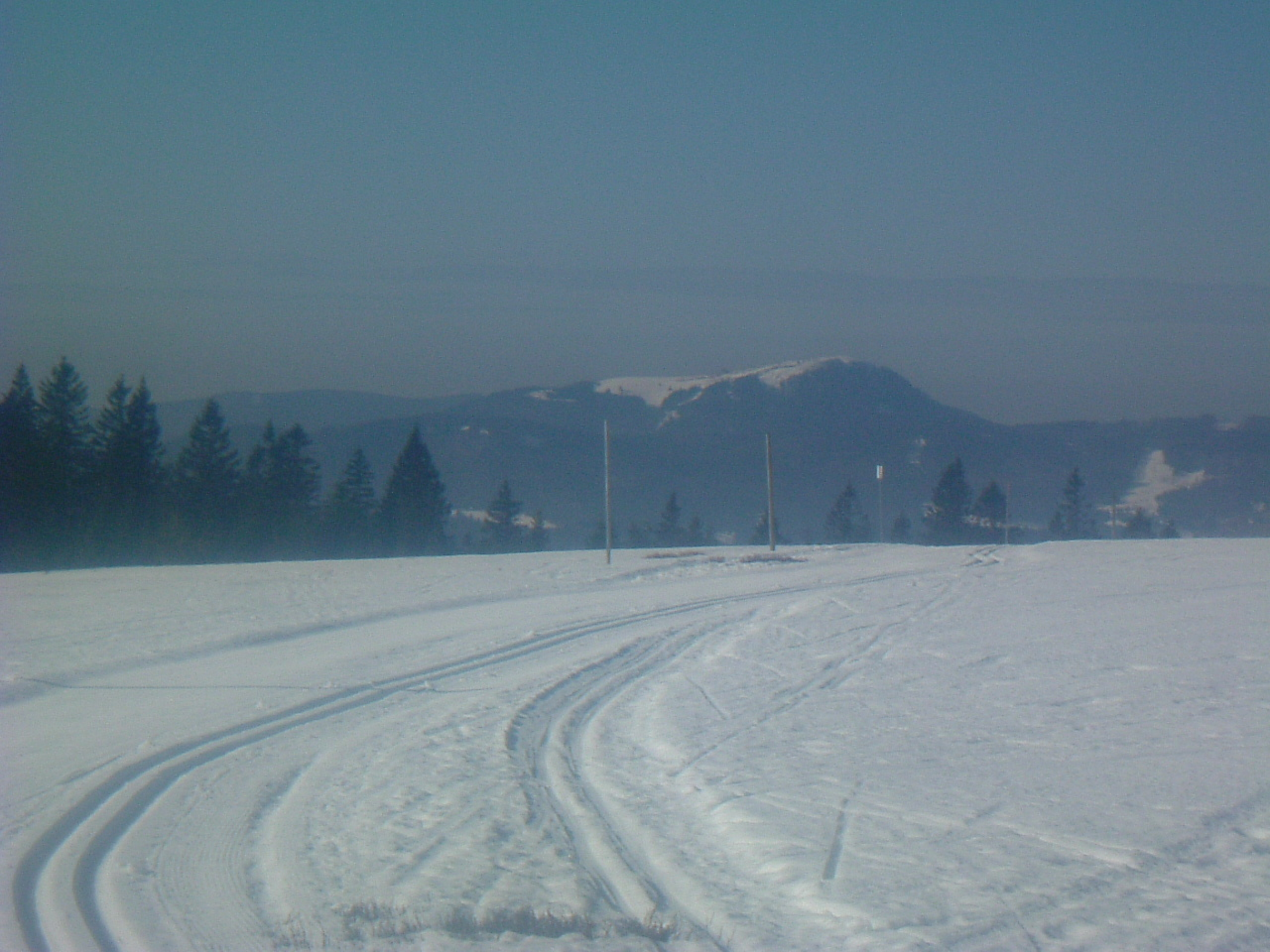
Stübenwasen Trail with view on the Belchen

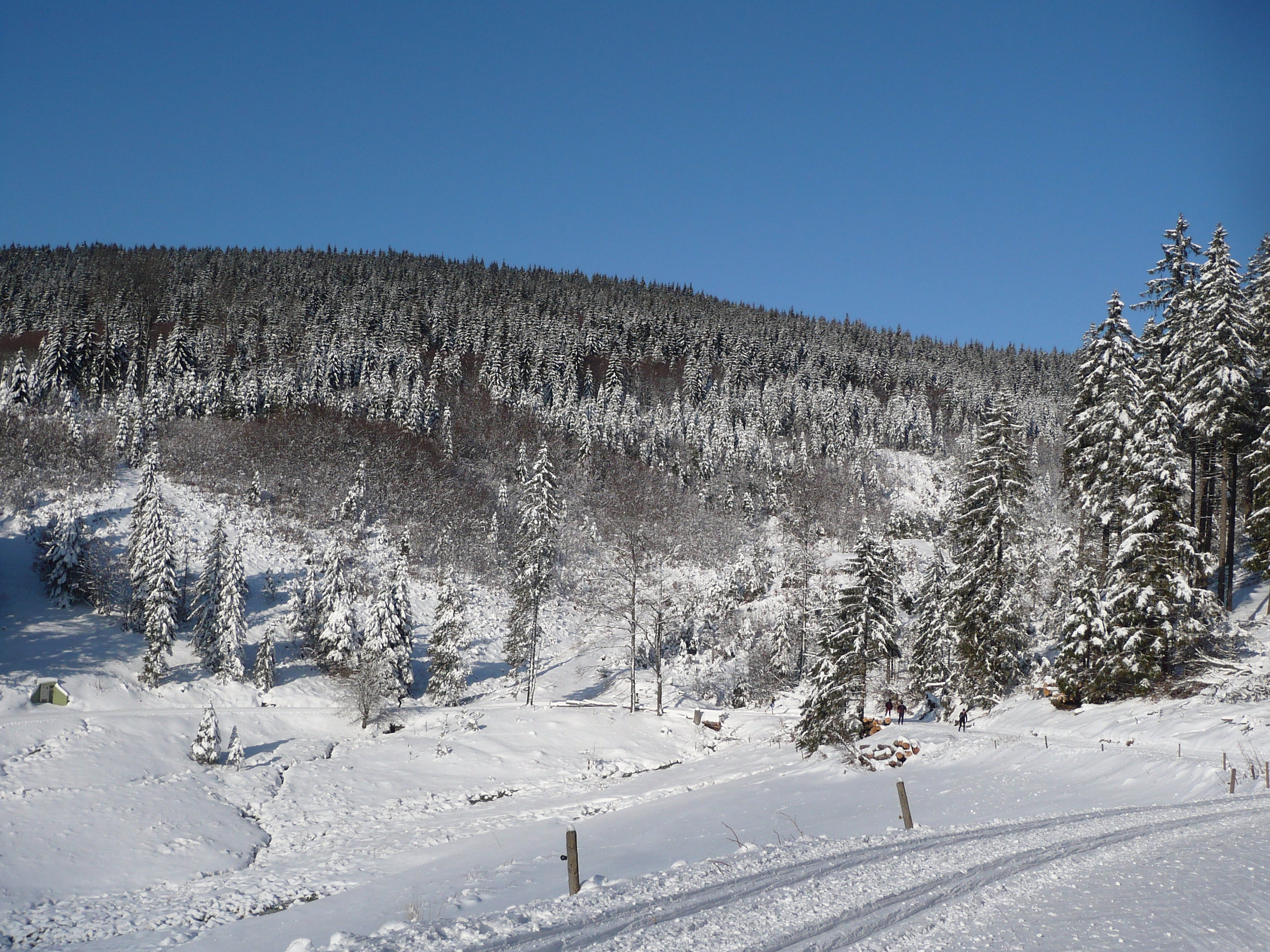
Valley above Wieden

The Notschrei Skiing Trails are a network of trails spanning approximately 40 kilometres. The trails are located on the Notschrei (1,119 m above NHN), which is a pass between the villages of Oberried and Todtnau in the Black Forest. The Notschrei Skiing Trails are also one of the five Biathlon base camps in Baden-Württemberg.

== Trails ==
Four skiing trails are located on the Nothschrei:

- Stübenwasen Trail (20 km starts on the Notschrei (1119m), continues over the Stübenwasen (1386m) and the Todtnauer Hütte (1300m) which is located on the Feldberg and finally leads all the way back. The elevation difference is about 260 metres and the total ascent is about 550 metres. There are several shortcuts: 6 km, 11 km, 13 km und 15 km. These shortcuts lead the Nordic skier to Muggenbrunn and the trails of Todtnauberg and the Feldberg. The trail has been changed oftentimes over the course of the last few years. The segment which led the Nordic skier over the biathlon area and all around the Ahornkopf was closed. Instead a loop and more elevation in the beginning were added.
- Schauinsland Trail (18 km starts on the Notschrei, continues over the Trubelmattskopf which is located close to the Wiedener Eck, and finally leads all the way back above the village of Muggenbrunn. This trail also includes some shortcuts: : 6 km, 9 km und 15 km. The Nordic skier here also has the possibility to visit Muggenbrunn, the mountain inn Knöpflesbrunnen and the Wiedener Eck, where there crosses another skiing trail which leads the Nordic Skier to the cross-country skiing centre Hohtann.
- Halden Trail is a floodlight trail which length varies depending on the snow situation. Its length is variable, most times however, 2.5 km. It is accessible via the Schauinsland Trail by a junction after approximately 1 km, the length of this said trail is approximately 1,5 km. The trail also offers connections tot the Hofgrund Trail and the summit station Schauinsland.
- The Biathlon Trail has an approximate length of 3 km. Regional and nationwide championships are being staged here.

All four trails are circular tours, which means they all lead back to where the trails started. Due to the various connection possibilities to adjacent trails, the Notschrei Trails can also be used as hiking trails. The hiking trail Schonach-Belchen, which is 100 km long, runs between the Todtnauer Hütte and Hörnle on the Notschrei Trails. All trails are always prepared to be used for classic and skating-technique skiing.

Since 2000, the number of Nordic skiers increased drastically due to global warming and the rising popularity of Nordic skiing. The Stübenwasen Trail is one of the few snow-sure trails in the Black Forest.

== Foundation and service ==
In 1975, the association Notschrei-Loipe e.V. was founded by the municipalities Freiburg im Breisgau, Kirchzarten, Münstertal, Oberried, Todtnau, Wieden and the Landesforstverwaltung Baden-Württemberg. Since 1997, around 5.700 private members have joined the club, including the foundation members (retrieved 2018).

The club runs a guest house at the start of the Stübenwasen trail, which offers a bathroom with a shower and a room where skis can be waxed. At the moment, the bedrooms on the second floor are reserved for athletes only. There is a service centre offering skis for rent, a Nordic skiing school and a parking site belonging to the club, all of which are located in close proximity.

== Biathlon Centre Notschrei ==
The biathlon centre has been the main training location for biathletes from the Black Forest for many years. It is the fifth biathlon centre in Baden-Württemberg, next to the centres in Gosheim, Schönwald, Ulm and Furtwangen. The centre on the Notschrei includes a shooting range for small-bore rifles and is the only one in Baden-Württemberg where national and international competitions are held. The shooting targets work electronically. The centre also serves as a training location during summer. In 2006, people decided to upgrade the centre for 750.000 € (around £657.712/$854.151).

== Competitions ==
The following regional and national competitions are held at the biathlon centre and the skiing trails on the Notschrei:

- German national biathlon junior championships (27 February till 2 March 2003)
- Biathlon Adventure Cup (18 December 2004)
- Baden-Württemberg biathlon finals (11th Februar 2006)
- Biathlon SV Cup (16th Dezember 2006)
- Germany Cup (5 January till 7 January 2007)
- FIS Nordic World Ski Junior Championships (2010)
- IPC Biathlon and Cross-Country Skiing World Cup (2010)
- European Foresters' Competition in Nordic skiing (2012)
