= Seebuck =

Mountain

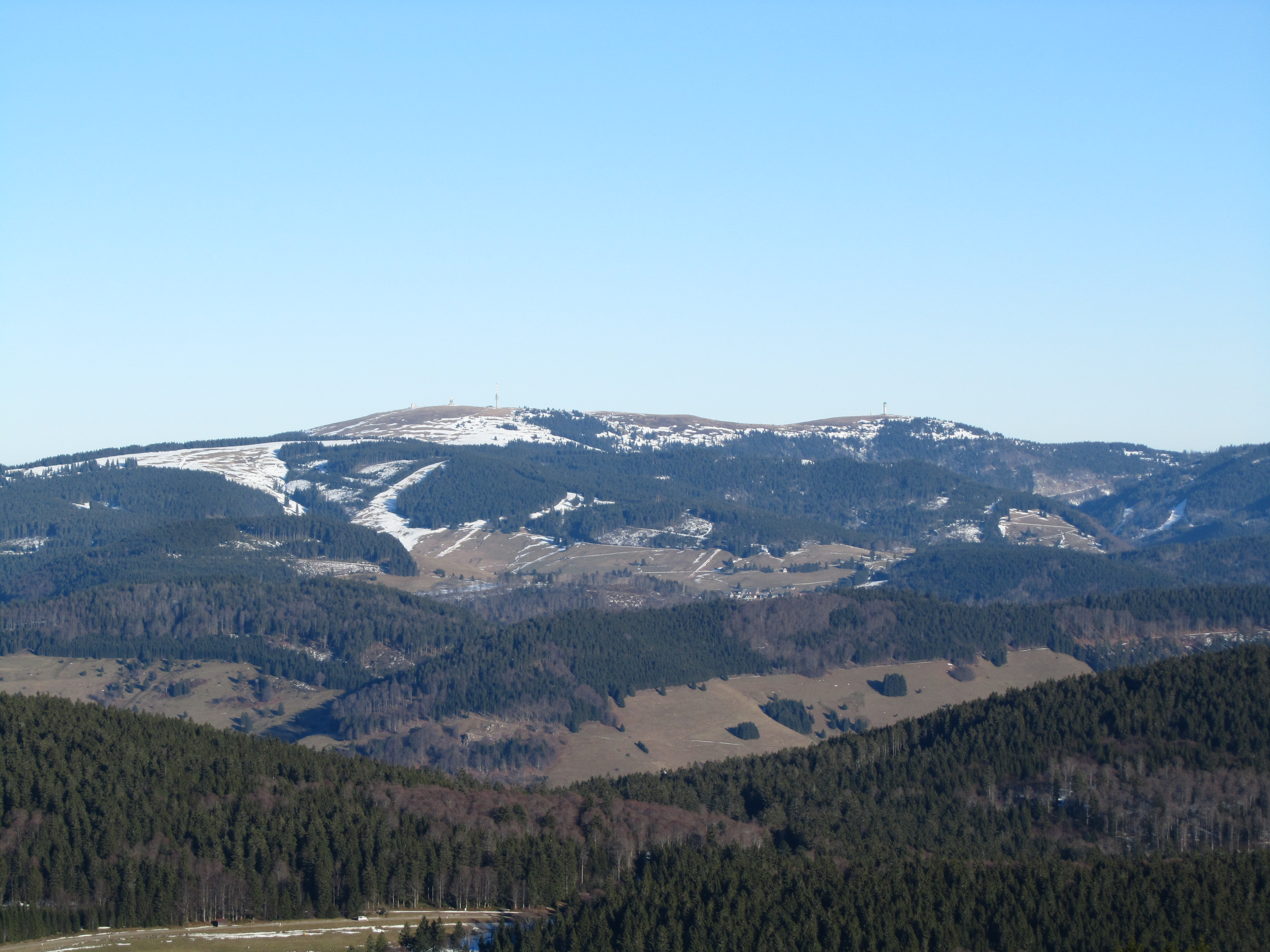
- The Feldberg (left) and Seebuck (right). Between them is the Grüble saddle; seen from the Belchen.

Highest point
- Elevation: 1,448 m above sea level (NHN) (4,751 ft)
- Prominence: 29 m ↓ Grüble
- Isolation: 0.65 km
- Coordinates: 47°51′52″N 8°01′20″E

Geography
- Location within Baden-Württemberg
- Location: Baden-Württemberg, Germany
- Parent range: Black Forest

At a height of 1,448.2 m above sea level (NHN), the Seebuck is the second highest mountain of the Black Forest after the Feldberg. It is located in the German state of Baden-Württemberg.

== Geography ==
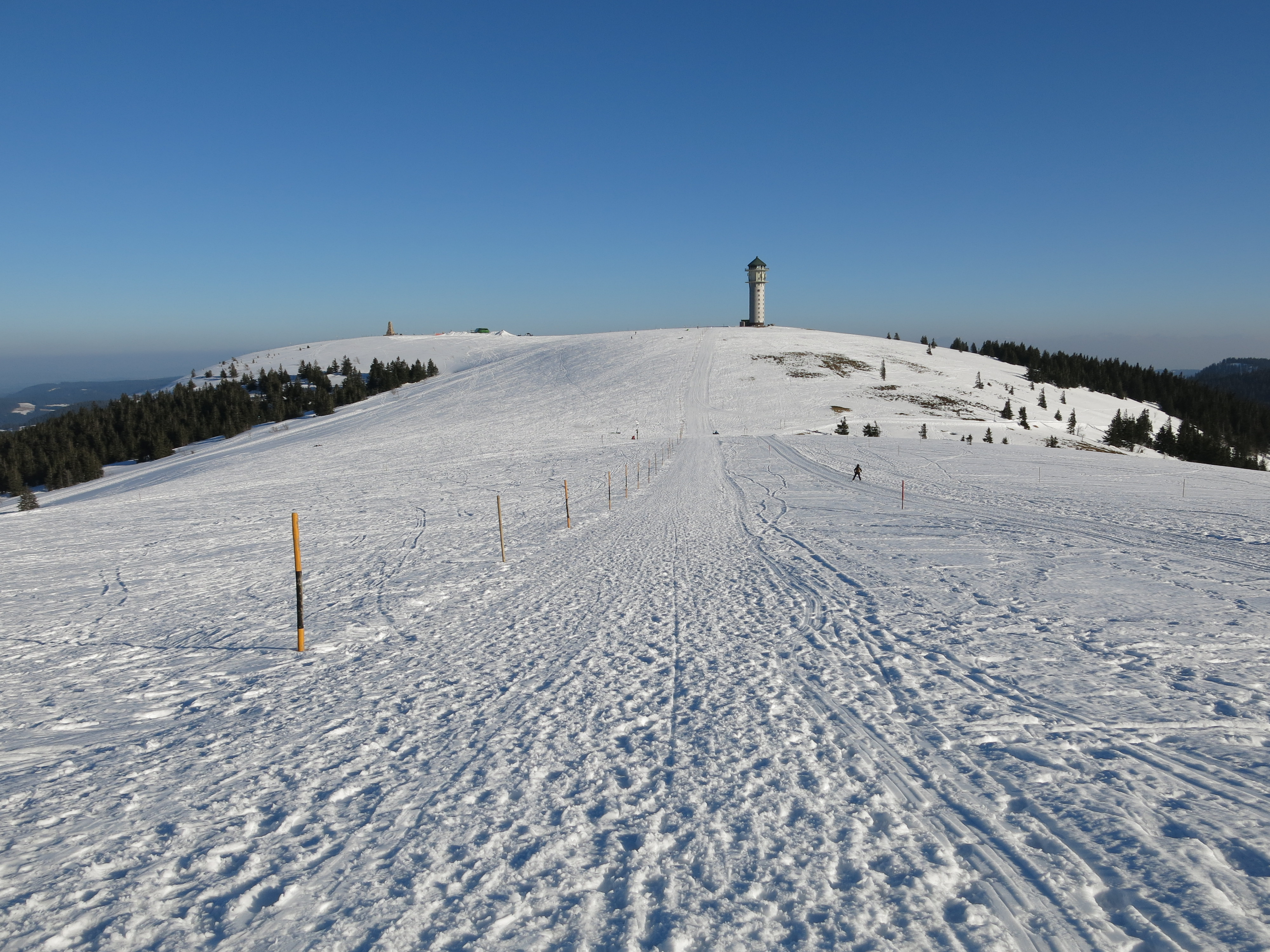
The Seebuck from the Grüble to the northwest

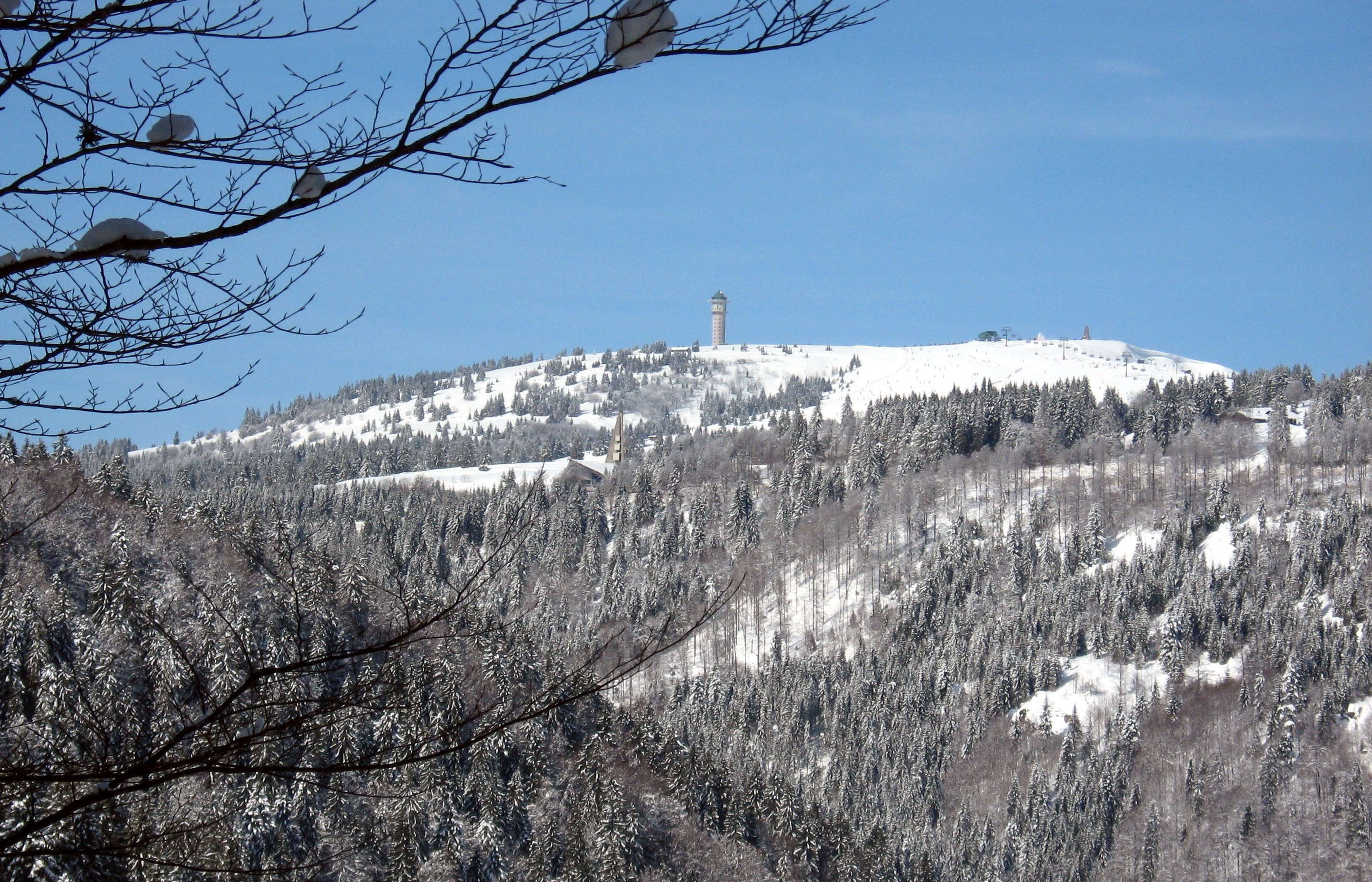
The Seebuck from the southeast

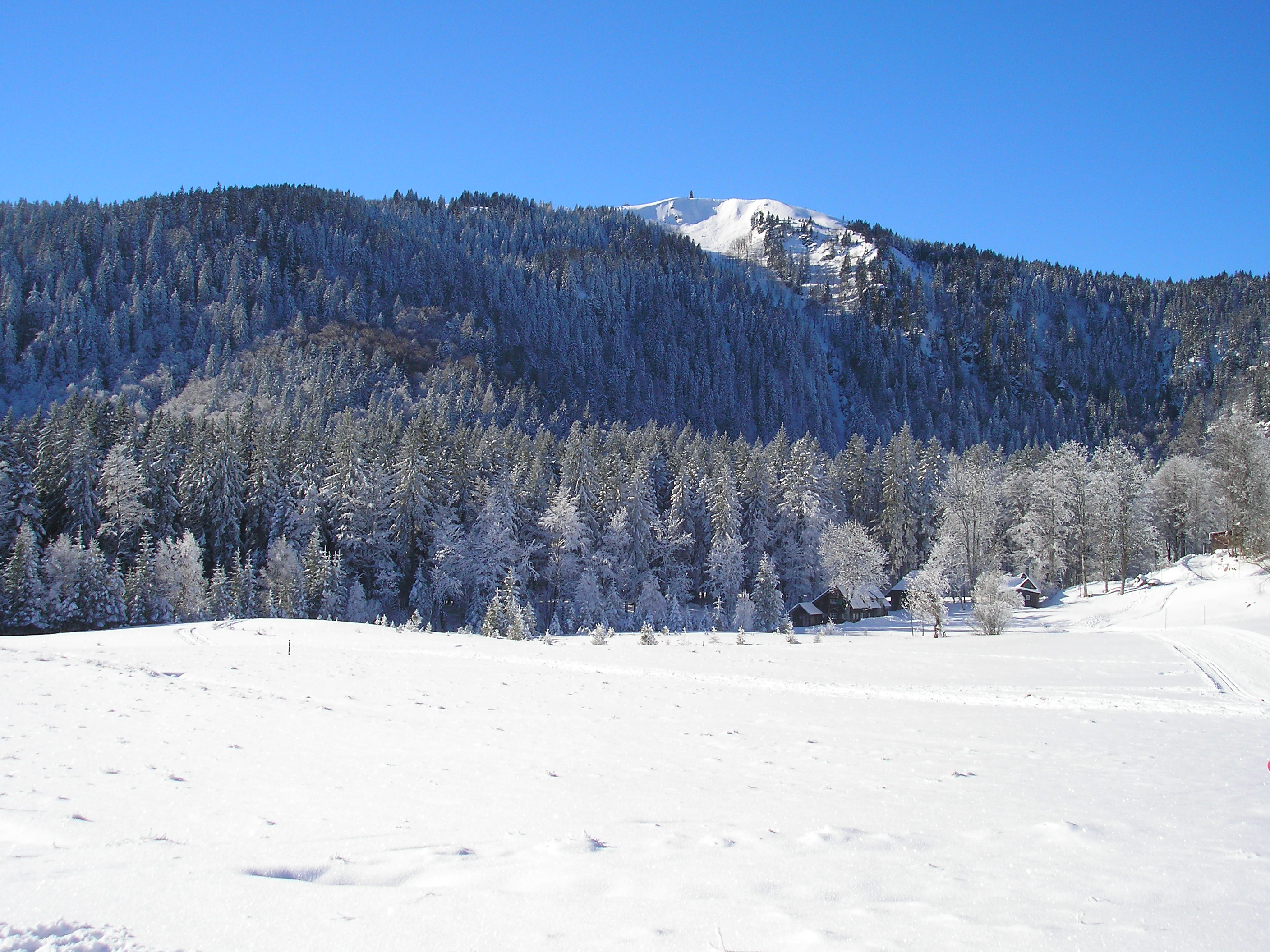
The Seebuck from the northeast

The mountain rises in the Southern Black Forest immediately southeast of the Feldberg, of which it is sometimes considered a part because both mountains are part of the same ridge, only separated by a shallow depression called the Grüble or Feldberg Saddle (Feldbergsattel).

The Seebuck drops steeply eastwards into the Feldsee lake, through which the Seebach flows, a stream that is later called the Gutach and then the Wutach. The Felsenweg ("Rock Path") which runs from the summit area down the steep mountainside to the Feldsee is generally only suitable for hikers with robust footwear and sure-footedness, but it tends to be popular due to its varied route and views of the landscape.

== Tourism ==
=== Feldberg Tower ===
The Feldberg Tower (Feldbergturm) is located on the Seebuck. This is a former transmission tower that now acts as an observation tower and, since 2013, has housed a ham museum.

=== Summer ===
The mountain is a popular destination for day trippers. The car park at the foot of the Seebuck is the base for numerous walks to the nearby ridge (to the Feldberg, Stübenwasen and Notschrei, to the Toter Mann, to the Herzogenhorn or to Hinterzarten), as well as walks to the nearby valleys (Menzenschwand valley, Wiese, St. Wilhelm's Valley, Zastler valley).

== Culture ==
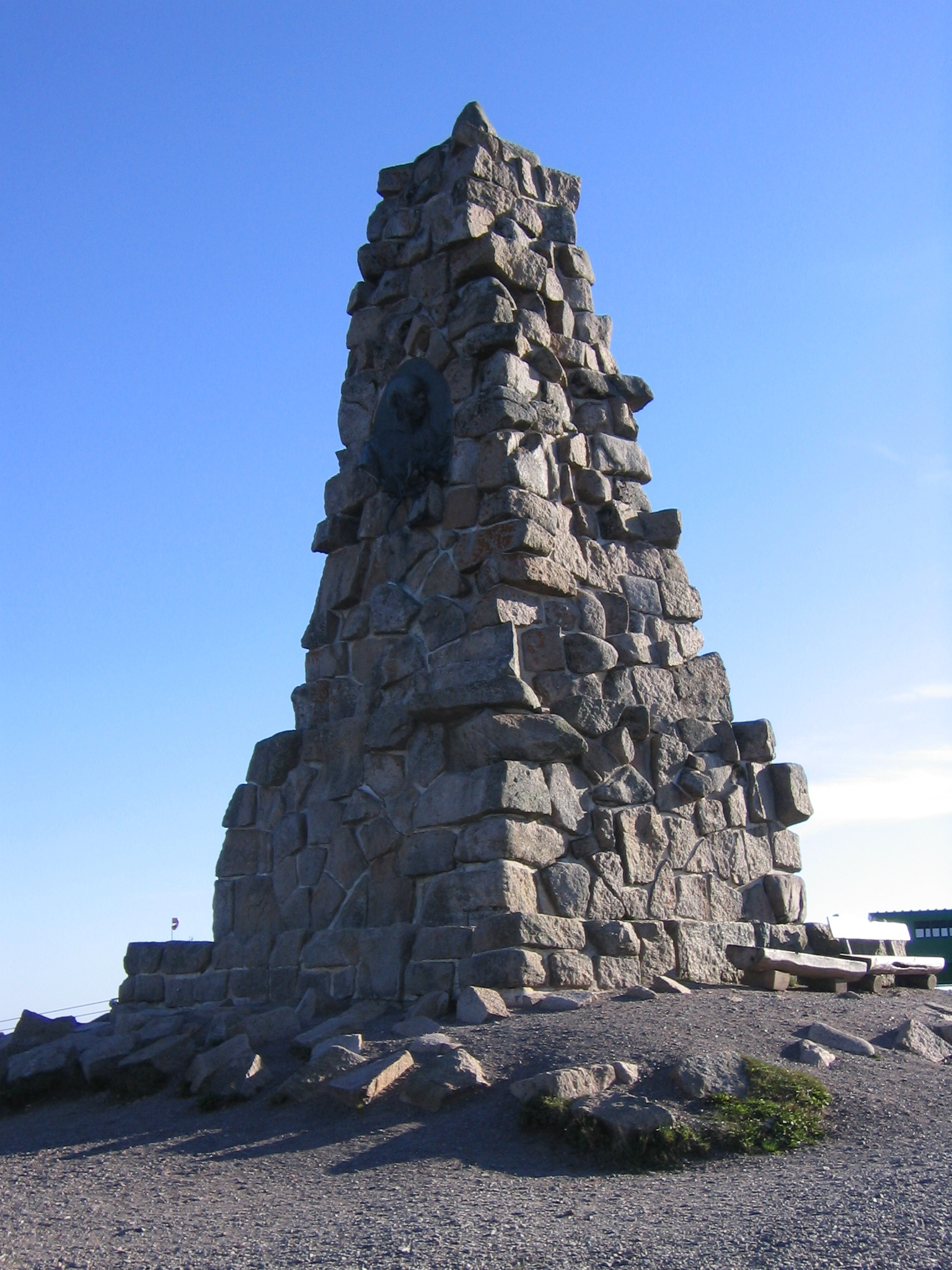
Bismarck monument on the Seebuck

In the summit area of the Seebuck on the edge of the Feldsee bowl is a Bismarck monument made of rubble stone, and on which is a portrait medallion, that was built between 1895 and 1896 by Fridolin Dietsche. The relief was cast by Wilhelm Pelargus in Stuttgart, the first sketch was made by Karlsruhe professor, Karl Gagel (1861–1916). For its unveiling on 4 October 1896, the committee for the erection of the monument sent Otto von Bismarck a telegramme. His answer was printed in the Freiburger Zeitung:

I am very grateful for the high honour, that has been bestowed on me with the erection of the monument on the Feldberg and from previous visits to the Black Forest have vivid memories to the beautiful Baden countryside.

— Otto von Bismarck

The occasion itself celebrated with a banquet on the evening before and an official lunch on the day of the opening ceremony. To handle the numbers of festival guests, a special train ran from Freiburg nach Titisee on the Höllental Railway.

In September 2009 the monument was renovated, the first time in eleven years.

On the edge of the large car park at the foot of the Seebuck (near the Feldberger Hof) a nature conservation centre for the Southern Black Forest was built, the "House of Nature" (Haus der Natur). A little below it, above the federal road is the highest church in Germany: the Catholic parish church of the Transfiguration of Christ.
