= Feldberg (Black Forest) =

Mountain in the Black Forest, Baden-Württemberg, Germany

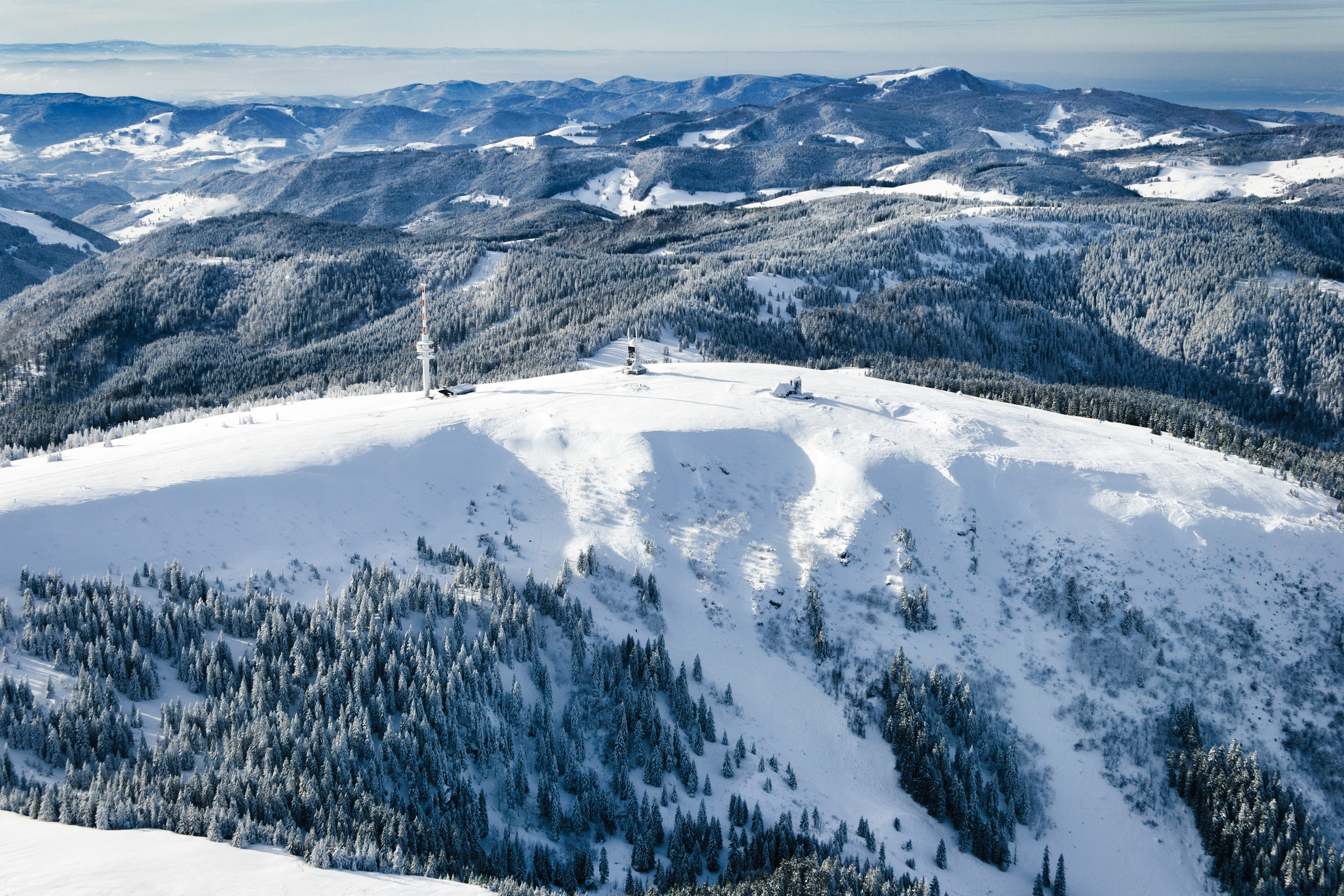
- Feldberg

Highest point
- Elevation: 1,494 m (4,902 ft)
- Prominence: 934 metres (3,064 ft)
- Parent peak: Stuiben (line parent)
- Isolation: 97.4 km (60.5 mi) to Gnipen
- Coordinates: 47°52′43″N 8°0′40″E

Naming
- Pronunciation: German: [ˈfɛltbɛʁk]

Geography
- Location within Baden-Württemberg
- Location: Baden-Württemberg, Germany
- Parent range: Black Forest

The Feldberg (German pronunciation: [ˈfɛltˌbɛʁk]) is the highest mountain of the Black Forest in the German state of Baden-Württemberg. At an elevation of 1,494 metres (4,902 ft), it is the highest mountain in Baden-Württemberg, and the highest in Germany outside of the Alps and Bavaria. The local municipality of Feldberg was named after the mountain.

== Environment ==
The Feldberg is situated southeast of Freiburg im Breisgau and is surrounded by the municipalities of Hinterzarten (northeast), Titisee (east), Menzenschwand (south), Bernau (also south) and Todtnau (southwest). About two kilometres southeast of the summit lies the village of Feldberg (1,277 metres (4,190 ft)).

Between the main peak (1,494 metres (4,902 ft), also known as the Höchste or "Highest", and its subpeak, the Seebuck (1,448 metres (4,751 ft)), just under 2 kilometres (1.2 mi) away, is a saddle, the Grüble, from which a wide spur, the Baldenweger Buck (1,460 metres (4,790 ft)) branches off. The saddle initially descends gently and then ever more steeply into the valleys on either side. From the Seebuck the Feldberg drops steeply away to the northeast into the Feldsee, a lake of glacial origin at about 1,000 metres (3,300 ft) elevation. Deeply incised valleys run northwest towards Freiburg (the Zastler and St Wilhelmer valleys) and southwest towards Basel (Wiesental valley).

The main car park below the Seebuck can be reached from the B317 (federal highway) running from Titisee to Lörrach (near Basel) over the Feldberg Pass. A train service of the Three Lakes Railway serves the station of Feldberg-Bärental, at 967 metres (3,173 ft), the highest DB station on standard gauge track. A bus service connects with the station. The Seebuck, which is topped by an old transmission tower, the Feldberg Tower, once a radio tower, since 2013 a ham museum can be reached from the valley station in Feldberg-Ort on a short chairlift. From this point the summit of the Feldberg is about two kilometres (1 1/4 mi) away. It is only accessible to the public on foot or by bicycle.

The numerous point-to-point radio systems of the Bundeswehr and the American and French armies dating from the Cold War period have been since taken down. Today Feldberg is marked by the old and new television towers and the Bismarck monument on the Seebuck.

Altogether there are more than 28 ski lifts and slopes around the Feldberg. The actual summit itself is situated outside the skiing areas. Several cross-country skiing trails around the peak and around Herzogenhorn opposite are popular with cross-country skiers. The whole area, with ski-runs of Alpine character, is popular for ski touring.

=== Nature reserves ===
Most of the Feldberg area has the status of a nature reserve due to its subalpine vegetation. The Feldberg Nature Reserve is the oldest and largest in Baden-Württemberg and has been under the charge of a full-time ranger since 1989. Since 2001 it has been the responsibility of the Southern Black Forest Nature Conservation Centre, based in the Haus der Natur ("Nature House"), to look after the reserve. They have a permanent, interactive exhibition and a comprehensive programme with events in the reserve. In 2005, a new nature trail was established immediately behind the house.

=== Views ===
The Feldberg offers one of the most extensive panoramic views in Germany – especially in winter when there is a temperature inversion. In the west, on the far side of the Upper Rhine Graben, can be seen the entire Vosges range, from the Ballon d'Alsace to Mont Donon and Mont Sainte-Odile. Beyond that the southern Palatinate Forest can sometimes be seen. To the north is the Hornisgrinde; to the northeast the entire chain of the Swabian Jura, including the Lemberg, and, to its right, the Hegau volcanoes.

To the south, the Alps can be seen from the Alpspitze and Zugspitze in the east to the Allgäu Alps, Verwall Alps, Silvretta, Säntis, Glarus Alps, Urner Alps, Bernese Alps and Mont Blanc in the west. In front of the Western Alps and, particularly right of Mont Blanc, can be seen the Swiss Jura, with their highest point, the Chasseral. Thus the view sweeps from the Italian Mont Blanc to southwest Germany and from Austria to France.

== Geology ==
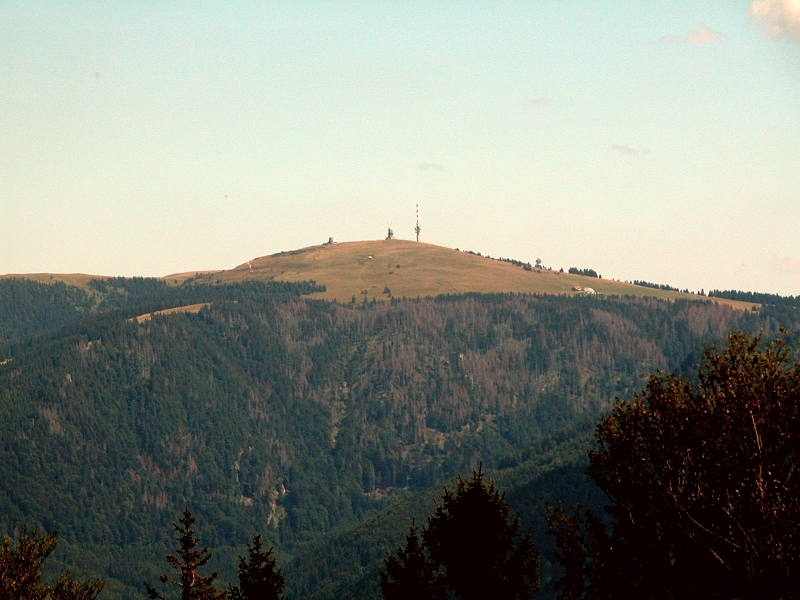
Feldberg

The mountain's bedrock of gneiss is around one billion years old. The Feldberg region was uplifted three times and then eroded again. What exists today can be called the "third Feldberg". The "first Feldberg" was formed in the Precambrian as part of an orogen and was then completely eroded away. The "second Feldberg" arose during the Devonian and Carboniferous, as part of the Variscan orogeny. It, too, was eroded away, and, during the Mesozoic and Early Triassic, beds of Bunter sandstone, Muschelkalk, Keuper, Lias, Dogger and Malm were deposited in the resulting sedimentation space. Some of these sediments are maritime deposits from intercontinental oceans; the others are of continental origin. The "third" and current Feldberg was formed during the Alpine orogeny in the Tertiary. Since then these sediments have been steadily removed through water processes and aeolian erosion, and today little but the bedrock remains.

== Glacial morphology ==
During the height of the Würm glaciation a glacier, 1,000 km^{2} in area, covered the Black Forest. As a result, a lot of glacial influence can be seen in the region. There are several features that relate to the glacial morphology of the Feldberg. Firstly, there is the Feldsee. This tarn formed in the hollow that was scoured out by the ice pushing down the headwall of the cirque. Gradually the ice created a bowl that now holds the 33-metre-deep Feldsee. A moraine on the shores of the Feldsee testifies to this process.

The Feldseemoor, a few metres away, is also a remnant of the ice age. Here the terminal moraine of the "mini glacier" can be seen from the Feldsee. It has impounded water and formed a bog. The glacial history of the Würm stage, 10,000–11,000 years ago, at the Feldberg evolved as follows: The emergence of the Feldsee happened as the "Feldberg glacier" spread out. The adjacent Feldseemoor was the next stage. The glaciers then formed a moraine at Waldhof. This was exceeded once more at the Falkau, which marks its maximum extent. After that, the glacier retreated again.

== Climate and vegetation ==
=== Climate ===
Feldberg features a subalpine climate (Köppen: Dfc), for its summers are mild enough to have fewer than four months with an average mean temperature above 10 °C or 50 °F. The annual mean temperature according to the 30-year mean from 1981–2010 is around 3.9 °C (39.0 °F), up 0.6 °C or 1.1 °F compared with the period from 1961–1990; temperature gradients are lower than those in adjacent valleys. During winter, there are long periods of sunshine, due to the low condensation point. This also means that the Feldberg has relatively mild winters; the surrounding valleys having noticeably colder temperatures. The lowest temperature ever recorded was −30.7 °C (−23.3 °F) on 10 February 1956. The average rain/snowfall amount is 1,637 millimetres (64.4 in) per year which is very high compared with Germany as a whole. On 97% of the survey marks of the German Weather Service lower figures are reported. Over the years snowfall has been reported in every calendar month. On average the Feldberg is covered in snow for 157 days per year. Because of its exposed location, wind speeds of hurricane force – up to 130 km/h (36 m/s; 70 kn) – are possible throughout the year.

Climate data for Feldberg Mountain WMO ID: 10908; coordinates 47°52′30″N 8°0′14″E; elevation: 1,489.6 m (4,887 ft); 1991–2020 normals, extremes 1931–present
Month	Jan	Feb	Mar	Apr	May	Jun	Jul	Aug	Sep	Oct	Nov	Dec	Year
Record high °C (°F)	12.9 (55.2)	16.7 (62.1)	15.1 (59.2)	21.1 (70.0)	22.9 (73.2)	27.0 (80.6)	27.4 (81.3)	26.4 (79.5)	24.6 (76.3)	21.2 (70.2)	18.1 (64.6)	13.9 (57.0)	27.4 (81.3)
Mean maximum °C (°F)	7.5 (45.5)	8.4 (47.1)	10.6 (51.1)	14.0 (57.2)	18.3 (64.9)	21.7 (71.1)	22.9 (73.2)	22.4 (72.3)	18.5 (65.3)	16.2 (61.2)	12.4 (54.3)	8.9 (48.0)	24.0 (75.2)
Mean daily maximum °C (°F)	0.1 (32.2)	−0.3 (31.5)	2.2 (36.0)	5.6 (42.1)	9.7 (49.5)	13.2 (55.8)	15.2 (59.4)	15.2 (59.4)	11.2 (52.2)	8.0 (46.4)	3.6 (38.5)	0.9 (33.6)	7.1 (44.8)
Daily mean °C (°F)	−2.4 (27.7)	−2.8 (27.0)	−0.4 (31.3)	2.8 (37.0)	6.7 (44.1)	10.2 (50.4)	12.2 (54.0)	12.3 (54.1)	8.5 (47.3)	5.4 (41.7)	1.1 (34.0)	−1.6 (29.1)	4.3 (39.7)
Mean daily minimum °C (°F)	−4.7 (23.5)	−5.1 (22.8)	−2.8 (27.0)	0.2 (32.4)	4.0 (39.2)	7.4 (45.3)	9.5 (49.1)	9.8 (49.6)	6.2 (43.2)	3.1 (37.6)	−1.1 (30.0)	−3.8 (25.2)	1.9 (35.4)
Mean minimum °C (°F)	−12.3 (9.9)	−12.8 (9.0)	−10.0 (14.0)	−7.2 (19.0)	−2.4 (27.7)	0.9 (33.6)	3.8 (38.8)	3.8 (38.8)	0.2 (32.4)	−4.2 (24.4)	−8.2 (17.2)	−11.8 (10.8)	−15.7 (3.7)
Record low °C (°F)	−25.7 (−14.3)	−30.7 (−23.3)	−20.3 (−4.5)	−13.7 (7.3)	−8.3 (17.1)	−3.5 (25.7)	−1.7 (28.9)	−1.1 (30.0)	−5.3 (22.5)	−11.1 (12.0)	−15.1 (4.8)	−23.0 (−9.4)	−30.7 (−23.3)
Average precipitation mm (inches)	119.3 (4.70)	88.7 (3.49)	102.4 (4.03)	101.7 (4.00)	165.2 (6.50)	150.0 (5.91)	155.4 (6.12)	141.8 (5.58)	131.4 (5.17)	153.6 (6.05)	134.0 (5.28)	150.1 (5.91)	1,589.4 (62.57)
Average extreme snow depth cm (inches)	64.0 (25.2)	88.6 (34.9)	94.6 (37.2)	72.2 (28.4)	13.2 (5.2)	1.5 (0.6)	0 (0)	0 (0)	3.4 (1.3)	9.7 (3.8)	24.9 (9.8)	48.9 (19.3)	109.0 (42.9)
Average precipitation days (≥ 0.1 mm)	18.6	17.4	18.2	17.1	18.9	17.4	16.7	17.0	15.3	17.5	18.0	20.2	213.4
Average snowy days (≥ 1.0 cm)	29.7	28.2	30.2	22.5	3.8	0.4	0	0	0.8	5.4	17.3	28.1	168.5
Average relative humidity (%)	80.8	81.7	82.5	80.1	81.7	82.6	81.0	81.2	84.7	82.5	81.8	81.7	82.0
Mean monthly sunshine hours	88.9	98.4	133.7	157.5	171.6	183.5	206.9	197.7	149.9	121.3	86.4	74.8	1,654.5
Source 1: NOAA
Source 2: Deutscher Wetterdienst / SKlima.de

=== Vegetation ===
As its name suggests, the Feldberg's summit is not wooded. However, the sharp transition to forest illustrates it is no natural border. Even the top of the mountain does not reach the tree line which, in this region, would lie at around 1,650–1,700 metres.

Many of the open areas are habitats for specialised species of flora; these include bogs, moors, rock faces and snow fields. Below the summit the mountain is covered by mixed forest consisting of naturally growing European beech, European rowan, European spruce, European silver fir and cultivated North American species Douglas fir. Human activity has resulted in forest clearings, such as the large open areas around every hamlet.

That is attributable to the intensive cattle farming in this region, which limits forest growth. Today one comes across both pioneer species like European Rowans and different sorts of shrubs there. On many places there are primeval forests being left to its own resources. A characteristic of the vegetation represent the moors.

== Tourism ==
=== Summer ===
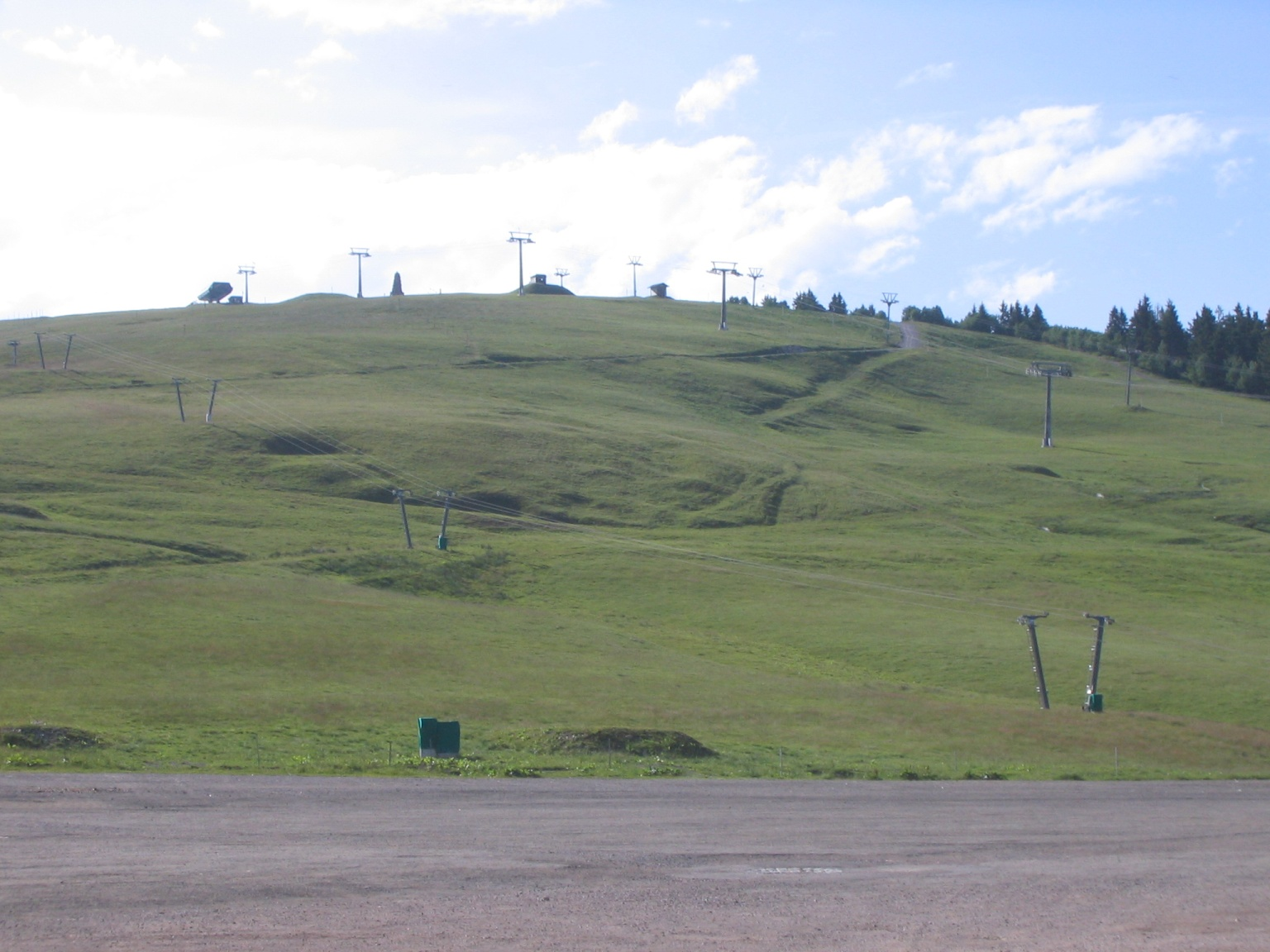
Ski lifts and the Bismarck Tower on the Seebuck

Today tourism is the main source of income in the Feldberg region.

The mountain has several managed huts and inns – the Baldenweger Hut, Rinken Hut, Zastler Hut, St. Wilhelmer Hut and Todtnauer Hut – for the benefit of walkers that are linked by footpaths. These include the Felsenweg ("Rock Way") and the Alpiner Pfad ("Alpine Path") which run through some of the last landscapes in the Black Forest that still have an Alpine character. The 12-kilometre-long Feldberg Steig ("Feldberg Path") runs around the summit and the Feldsee. In addition there are metalled roads to the inns and other facilities around the peak.

=== Winter ===
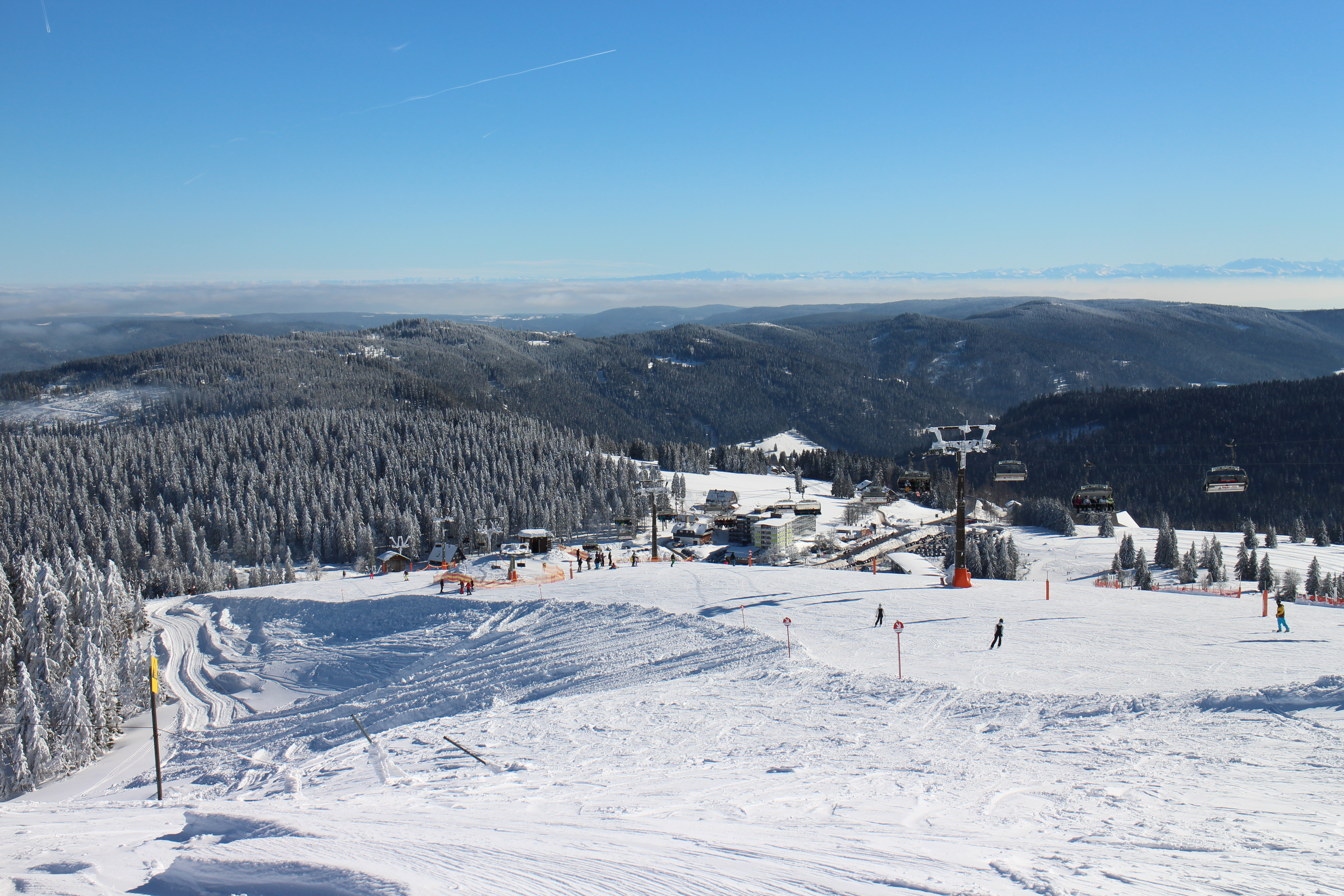
The Seebuck chairlift and piste

Feldberg is the biggest winter skiing resort in Germany outside of the Alps. The first ski lift was originally built in 1907 in the Feldberg area. Today, there are around 14 ski lifts (including five at the Seebuck, among them a six-seater chairlift) and over 50 kilometres (31 mi) of downhill runs up to a "black" level of difficulty. When there is sufficient snow, even a terrain park may be created. At the valley station are several garages for piste bashers and other equipment. There is a mountain rescue post below the old TV tower.

There are also many Nordic ski trails around the peak; two of which are the highest ones of Baden-Württemberg. Part of the cross-country skiing trail from Schonach to Belchen runs between Feldberg and Seebuck.

== Alpine dangers ==
The Feldberg, like many low mountain ranges, is often underestimated in terms of its alpine dangers. Its easy accessibility by public transport, car and cable car suggests that it is not dangerous and, consequently, visitors may be inappropriately equipped or dressed. The main dangers in the Feldberg region are sudden falls in temperature, storms or slipping on smooth, icy ground. Near tall structures such as the transmission masts there is the danger falling ice. In fog or mist, orientation is clearly much more difficult. Often visibility is reduced to just a few metres. Marked paths outside the wooded areas are lined with poles to assist navigation.

Every winter there are several large avalanches in the Feldberg region. The mountainsides of the Zastler valley are particularly prone, but they also occur on leeward slopes like the Feldseekessel at Seebuck, the Herzogenhorn and the Baldenweger Buck. Snowfall driven by western winds forms cornices on the downwind sides of ridges (e. g. the Zastler Wechte), which can break off. Several fatal avalanche burials have happened, the last in January 2015 which left two dead. There are no special avalanche reports issued for the Black Forest.

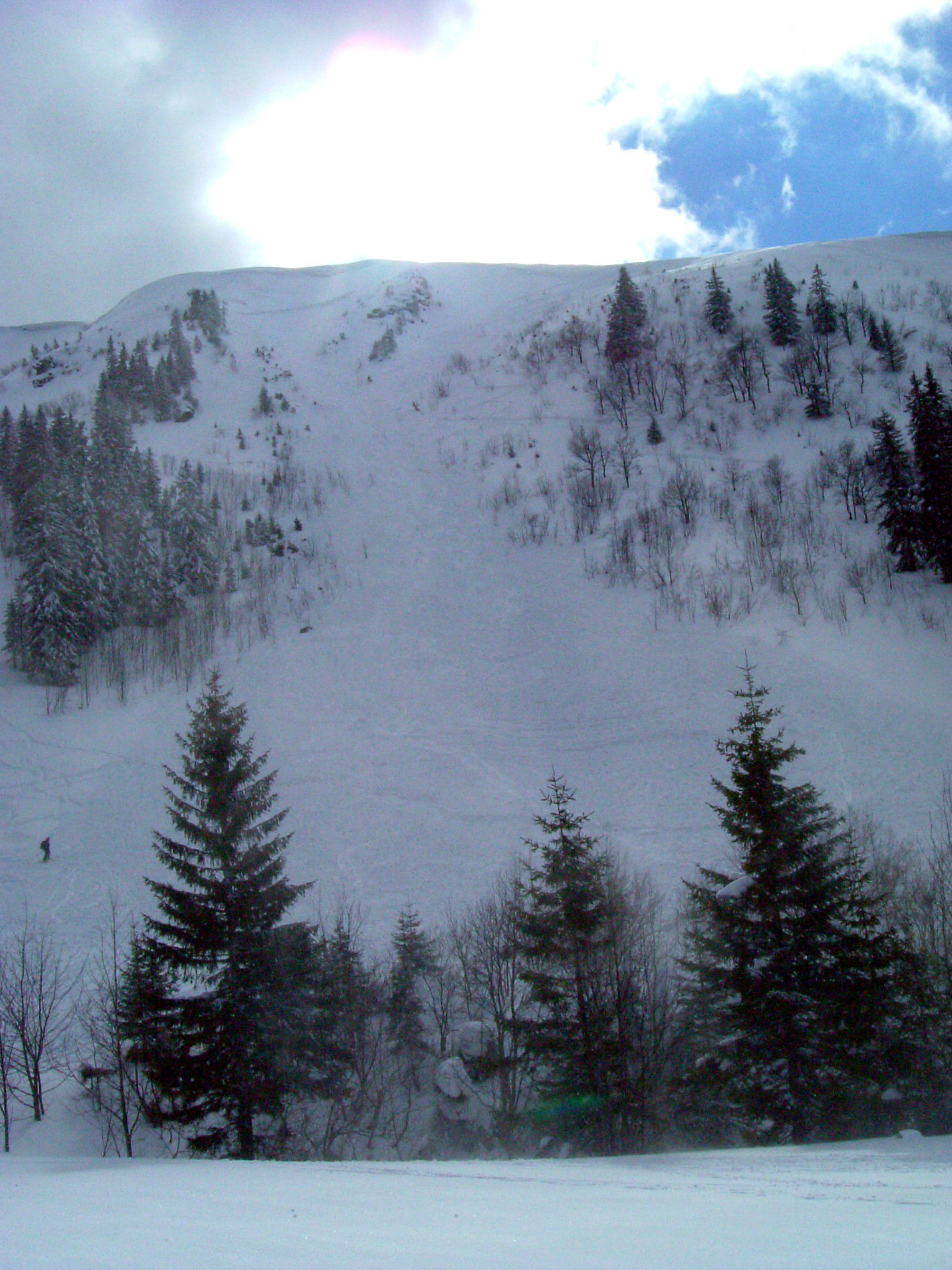
Avalanche slope in the Zastler Loch

== Television towers ==
During the Cold War there were many antennas on a military tower at the summit, but these were removed some years ago. Today, there is a large TV / radio transmission mast, used by the regional broadcasting station, SWR (Southwest Broadcasting). In addition, the mountain is recognisable from its Bismarck Monument, in honour of the famous 19th-century chancellor of Germany, Otto von Bismarck.

== Meteorological station ==
At the top of the mountain (where weather has been surveyed since 1915) is a weather station that has been in operation since 1937, run by the German Meteorological Service (WMO code number: 10908). Next to the observatory is a weather radar.

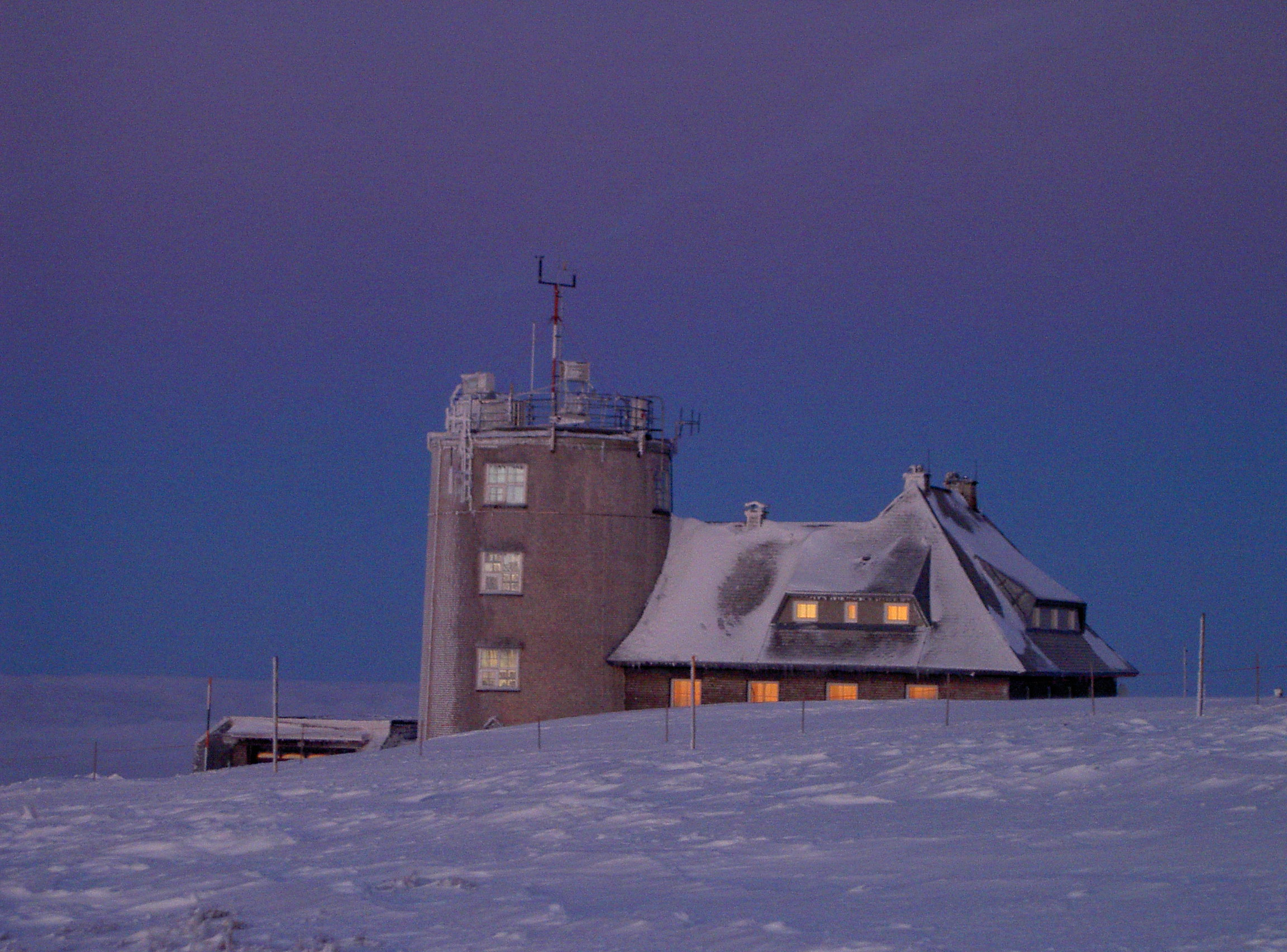
Weather station

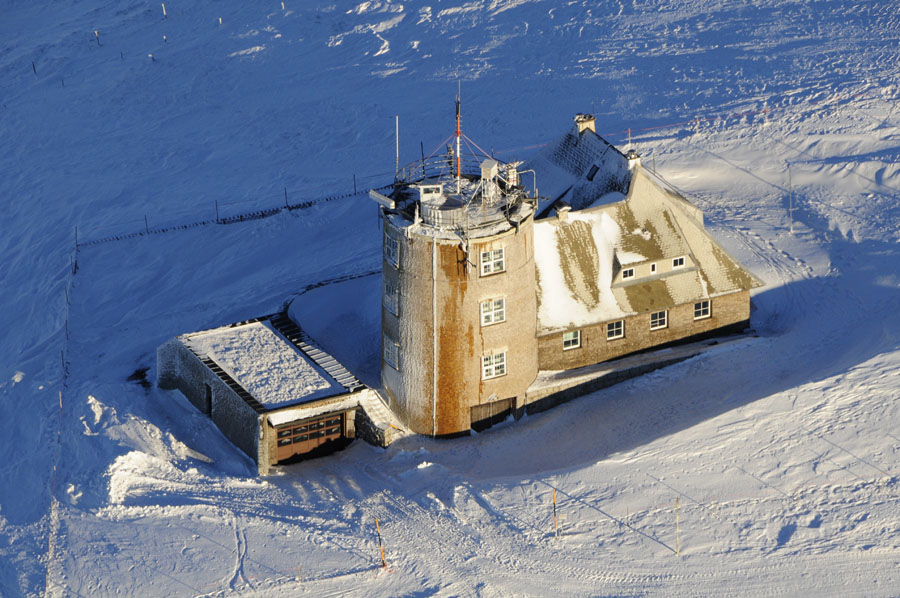
Aerial photograph

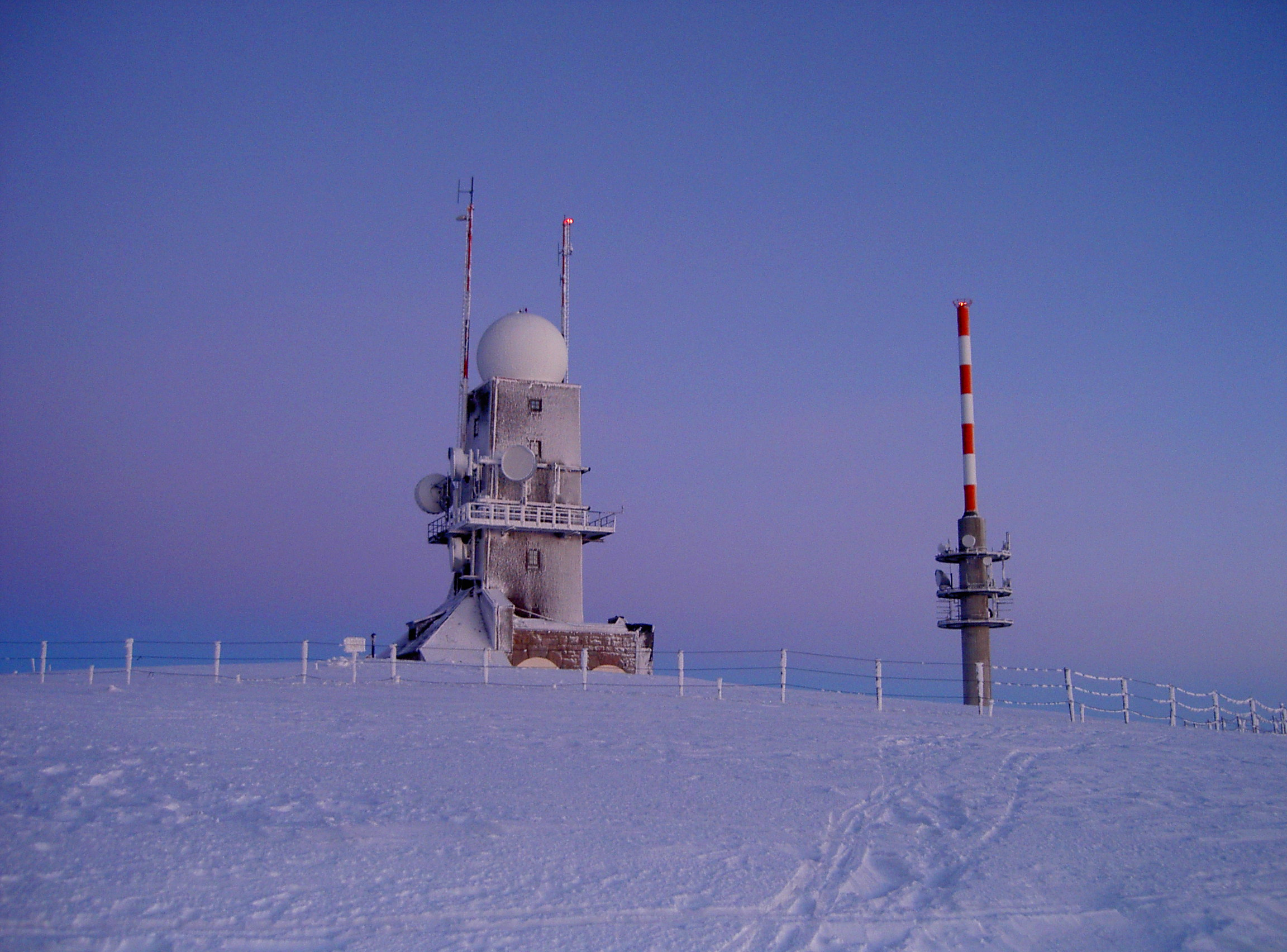
Weather radar with the new Feldberg Tower in the background
