= List of mountains and hills of the Black Forest =

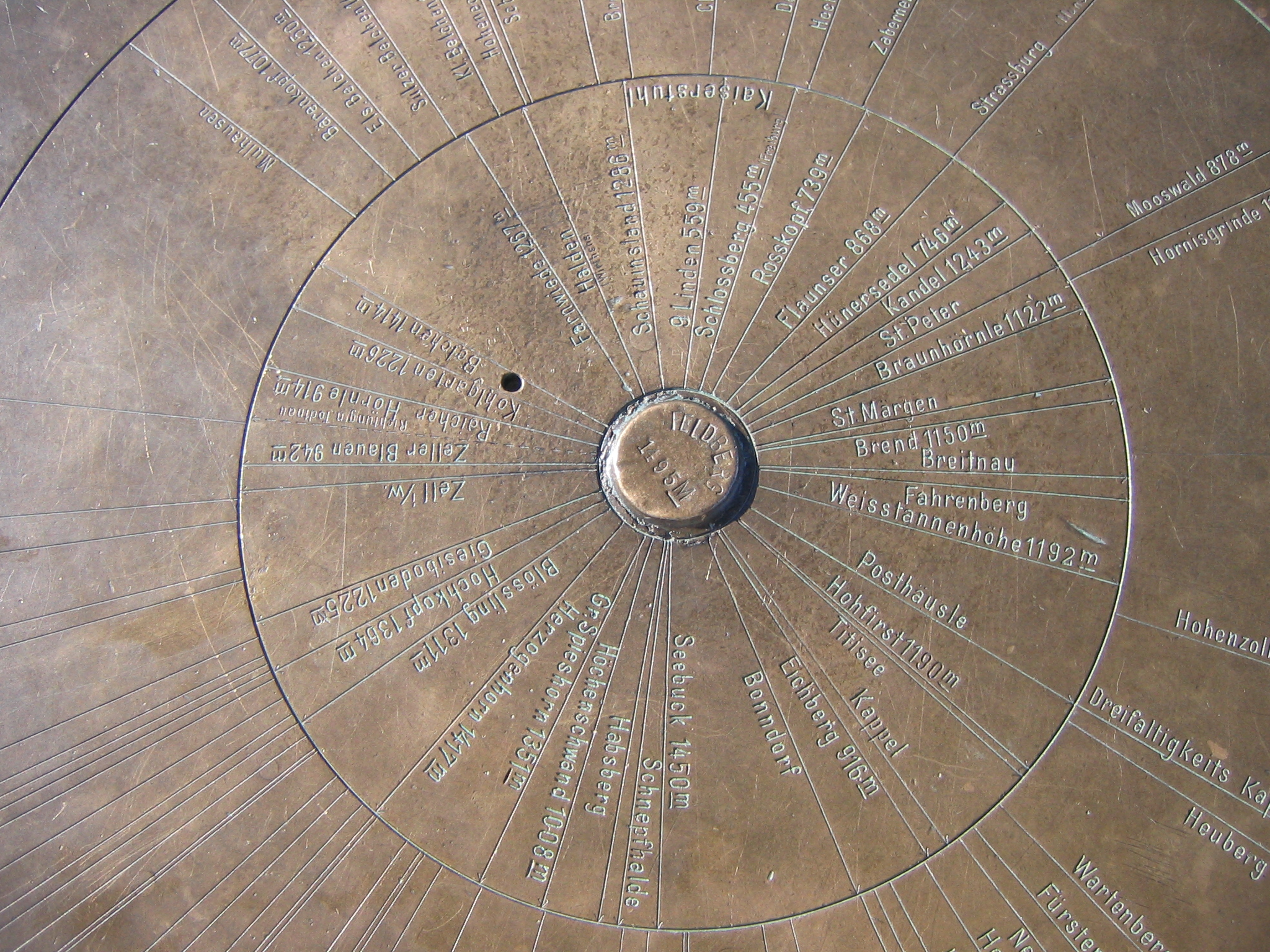
The toposcope at the summit of the Feldberg

The list contains a selection of the mountains and hills in the Black Forest, in order of their altitude.

== Over 1,400 m ==
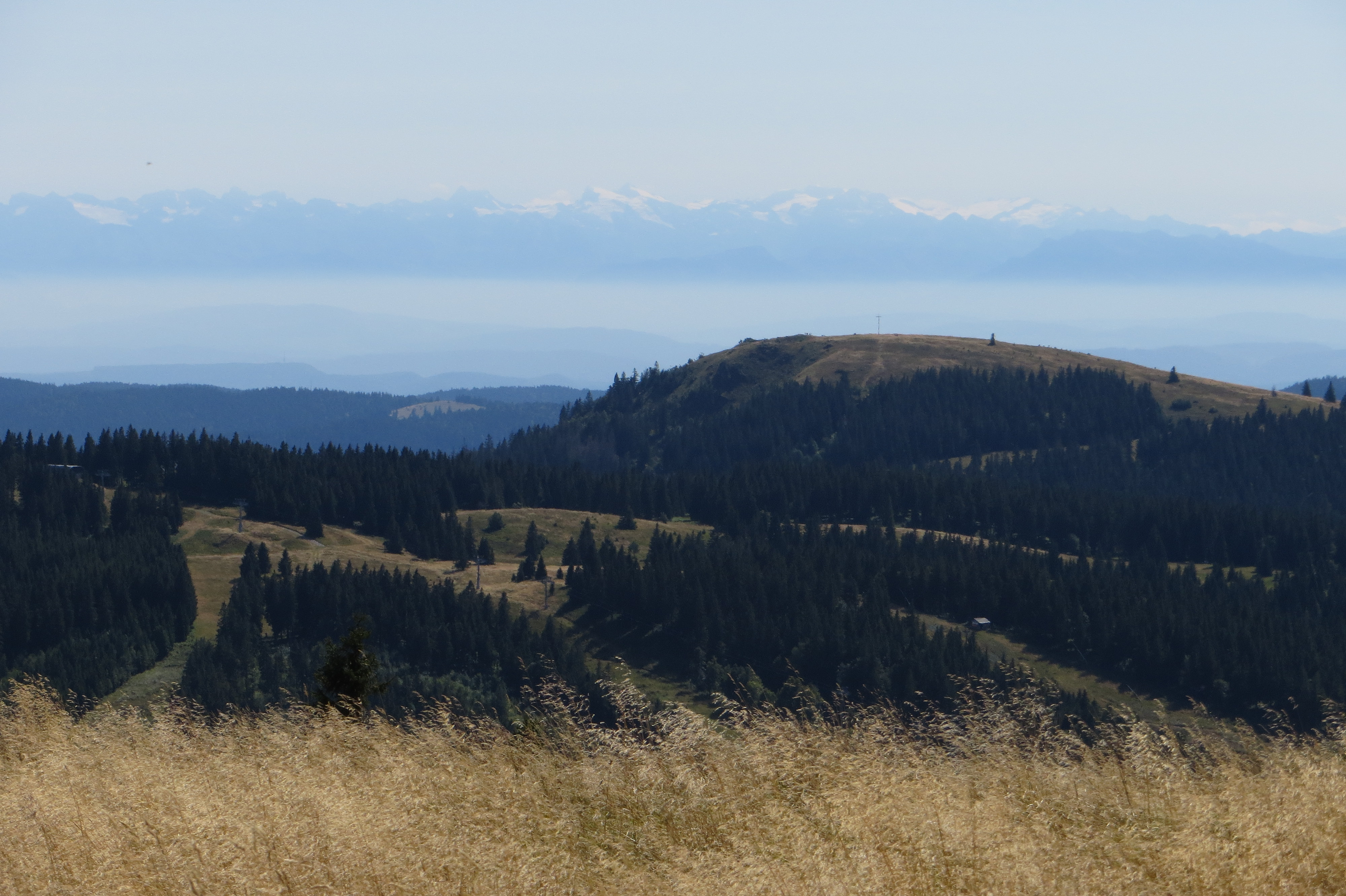
The Herzogenhorn seen from the Feldberg with the Alps behind

- Feldberg (1,493 m), highest mountain in the German Central Uplands

- Baldenweger Buck (1,460 m), northern subpeak of the Feldberg
- Seebuck (1,448 m), southeastern subpeak of the Feldberg

- Herzogenhorn (1,415 m), south of the Feldberg
- Belchen (1,414 m), southwest of the Feldberg

== Over 1,300 m ==
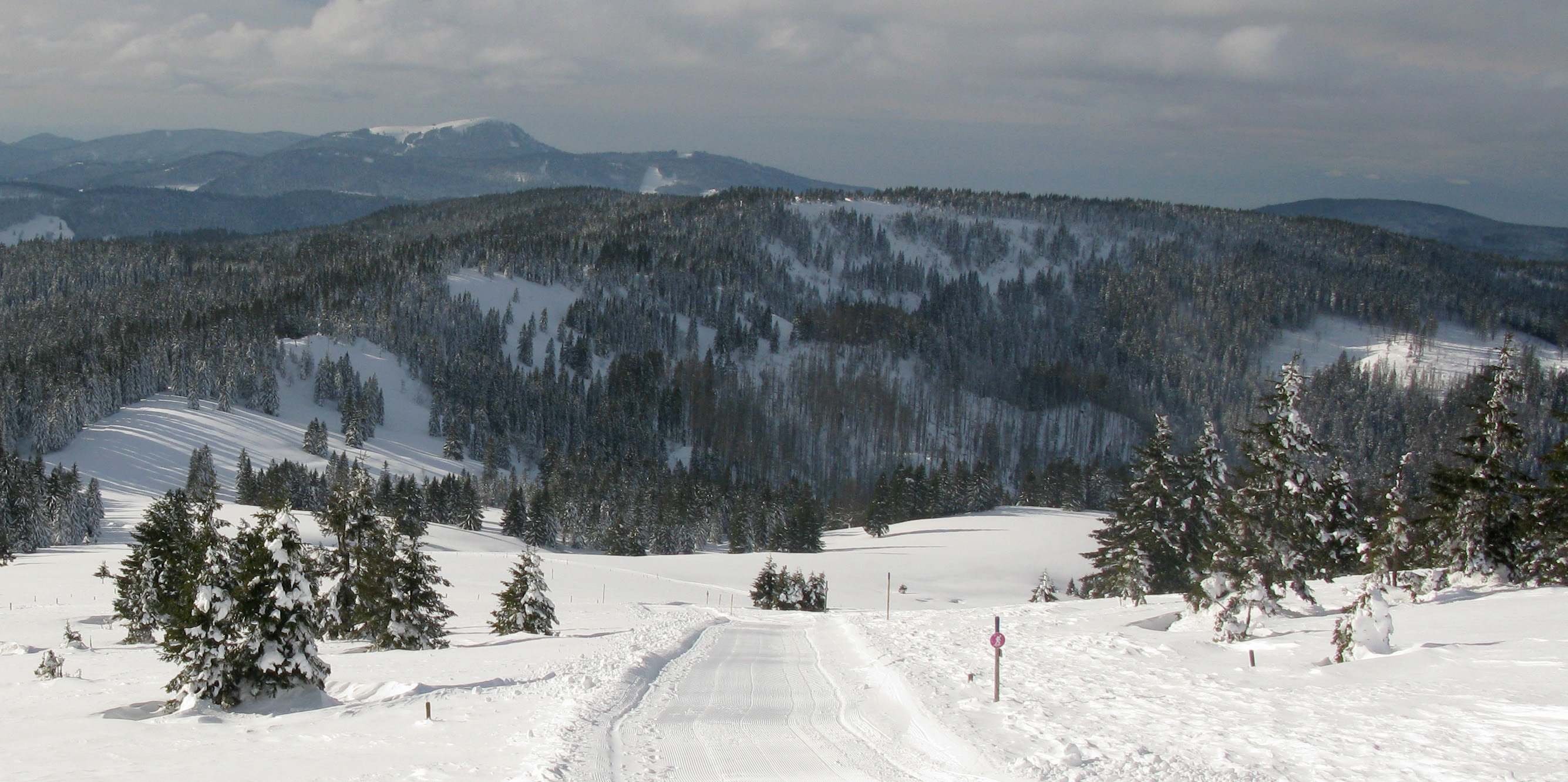
The Stübenwasen

- Stübenwasen (1,386 m), between Feldberg and Notschrei
- Grafenmatte (1,377 m), between Feldberg and Herzogenhorn
- Immisberg (1,373 m), northwest of the Feldberg
- Silberberg (1,358 m), between Todtnau-Brandenberg and Herzogenhorn
- Spießhorn (1,349 m), between Bernau-Hof and Menzenschwand
- Toter Mann (1,321 m), between Feldberg and Oberried
- Bärhalde (1,317), between Neuglashütten and Menzenschwand
- Köpfle (Feldberger Hof) (1,317 m), near the Feldberger Hof
- Blößling (1,309 m), southwest of Bernau
- Schweizerwald (1,305 m), 3 km north of the Seebuck

== Over 1,200 m ==
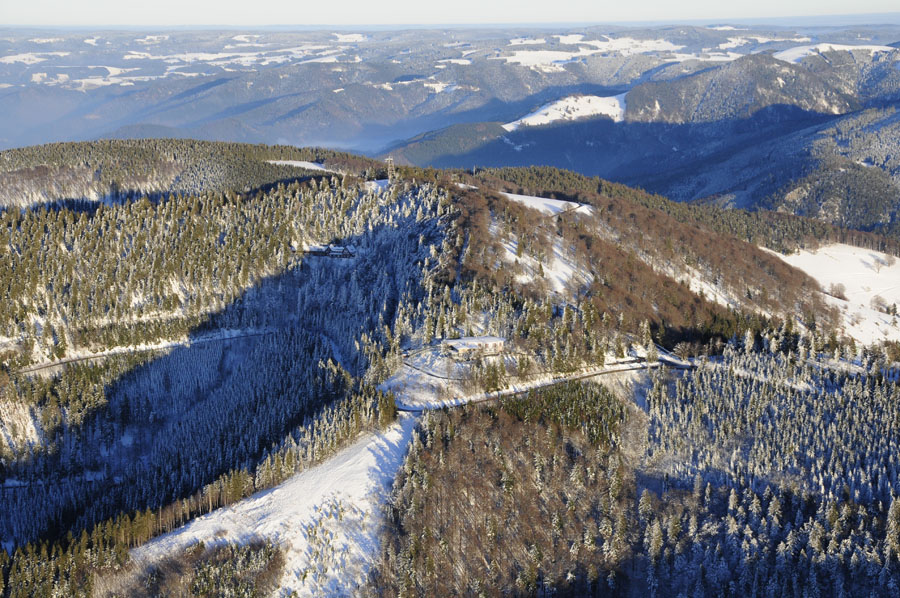
The Schauinsland

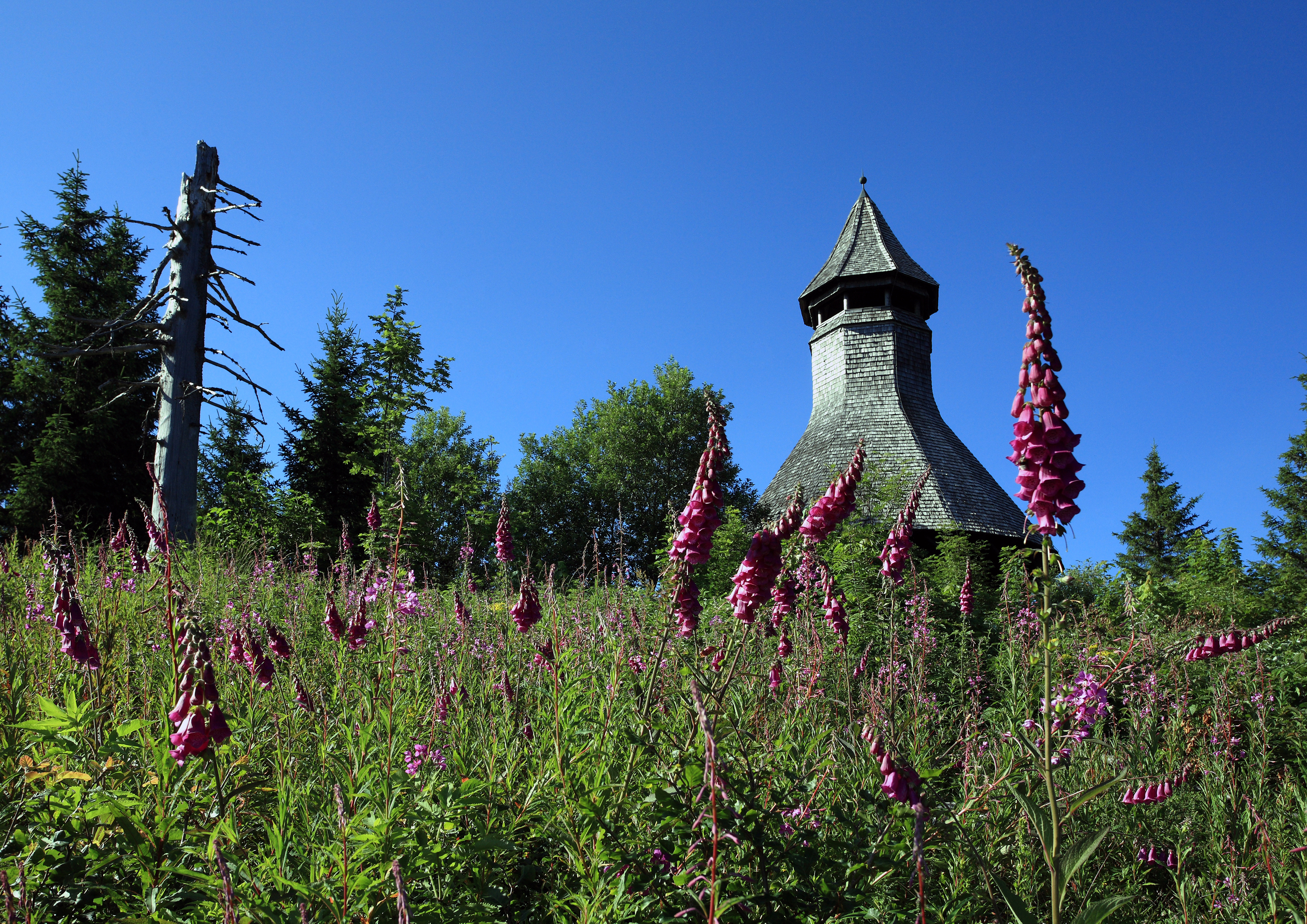
The observation tower on the Hochkopf

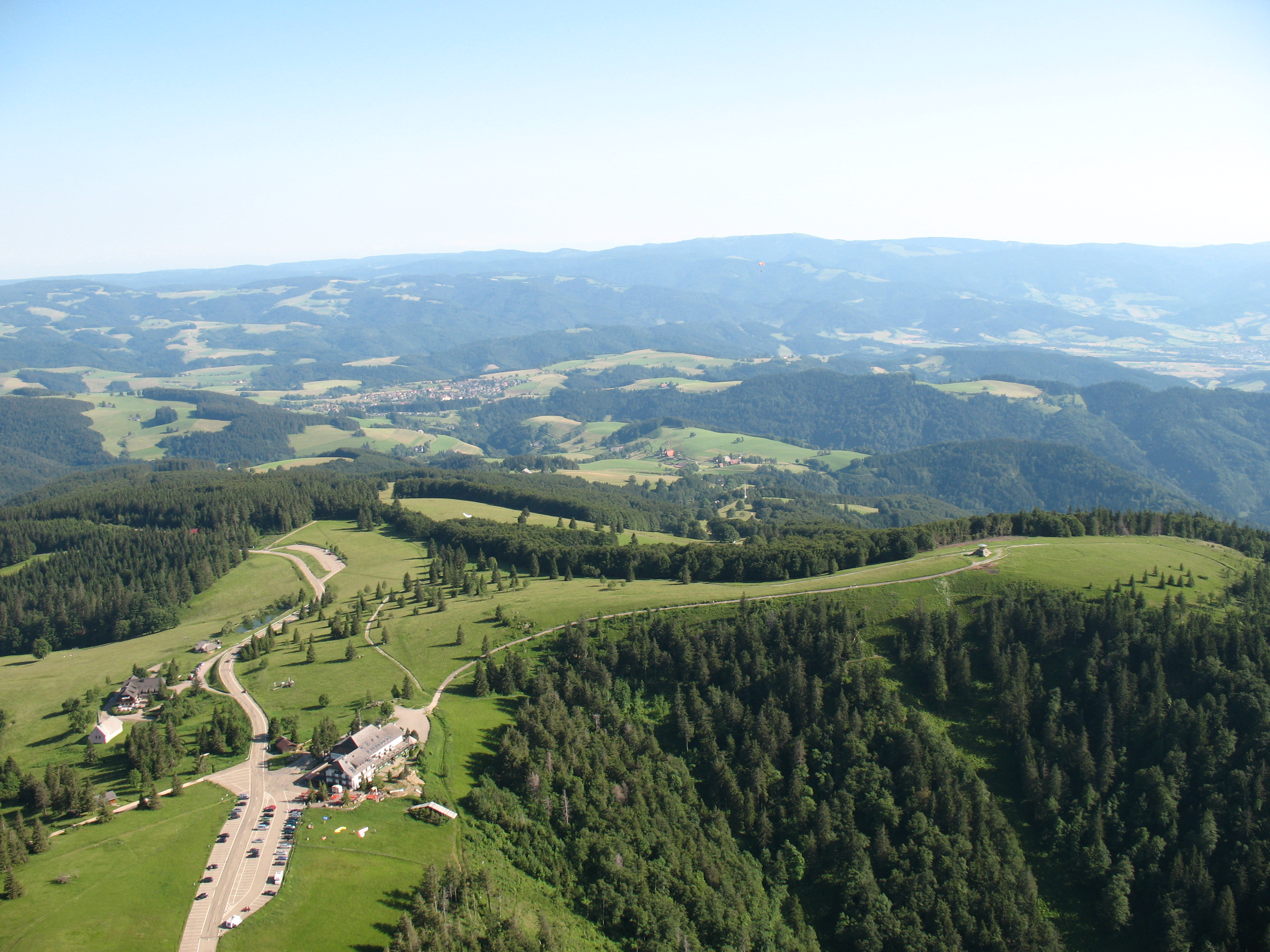
Summit of the Kandel

- Schnepfhalde (1,299 m), between Schluchsee and Menzenschwand
- Schauinsland (1,284 m), local mountain of Freiburg im Breisgau
- Trubelsmattkopf (1,281 m), between Notschrei, Muggenbrunn and Wiedener Eck
- Heidstein (1,274 m), between Belchen and Wiedener Eck
- Oberer Habsberg (1,274 m), west of the Schluchsee (often wrongly spelt Hubsberg; other tops at 1,263 m and 1,253 m)

- Unterer Habsberg (1,204 m)

- Kapellenkopf (1,273 m), between Schluchsee-Aha and Bernau-Hinterdorf
- Wieswaldkopf (1,270 m), between Feldberg and Hinterzarten
- Haldenköpfle (1,265 m), between Schauinsland and Notschrei
- Hirschkopf (1,264 m), between St. Wilhelm and Notschrei
- Hochfahrn (1,264 m), between Feldberg and Oberried
- Hochkopf (1,263 m), between Neuglashütten and Feldberg by the Bundesstraße 317
- Schweinekopf (1,257 m), west of the Blößling
- Schmaleck (1,253 m), between St. Wilhelm and Feldberg
- Ahornkopf (1,243 m), between Notschrei and St. Wilhelm
- Gisiboden (1,243 m), between Todtnau and Bernau
- Hohe Zinken (1,242 m), southwest of Bernau
- Kandel (1,241 m), between St. Peter (High Black Forest) and the Elz valley
- Köpfle (Todtnau) (1,235 m), northwest of Todtnau-Muggenbrunn
- Köhlgarten (1,224 m), between Belchen and Blauen
- Horneck (1,222 m), between Hinterzarten and Oberried
- Farnberg (1,218 m), between Todtmoos-Rütte and St. Blasien
- Bankgallihöhe (1,210 m), between Hinterzarten and Oberried
- Bötzberg (1,209 m), between Schluchsee and St. Blasien
- Windeckkopf (1,209 m), southwest of Hinterzarten
- Sengalenkopf (1,208 m), 2 km east of Todtnau-Gschwend
- Hochgescheid (1,205 m), 3 km southeast of Schönau

== Over 1,100 m ==
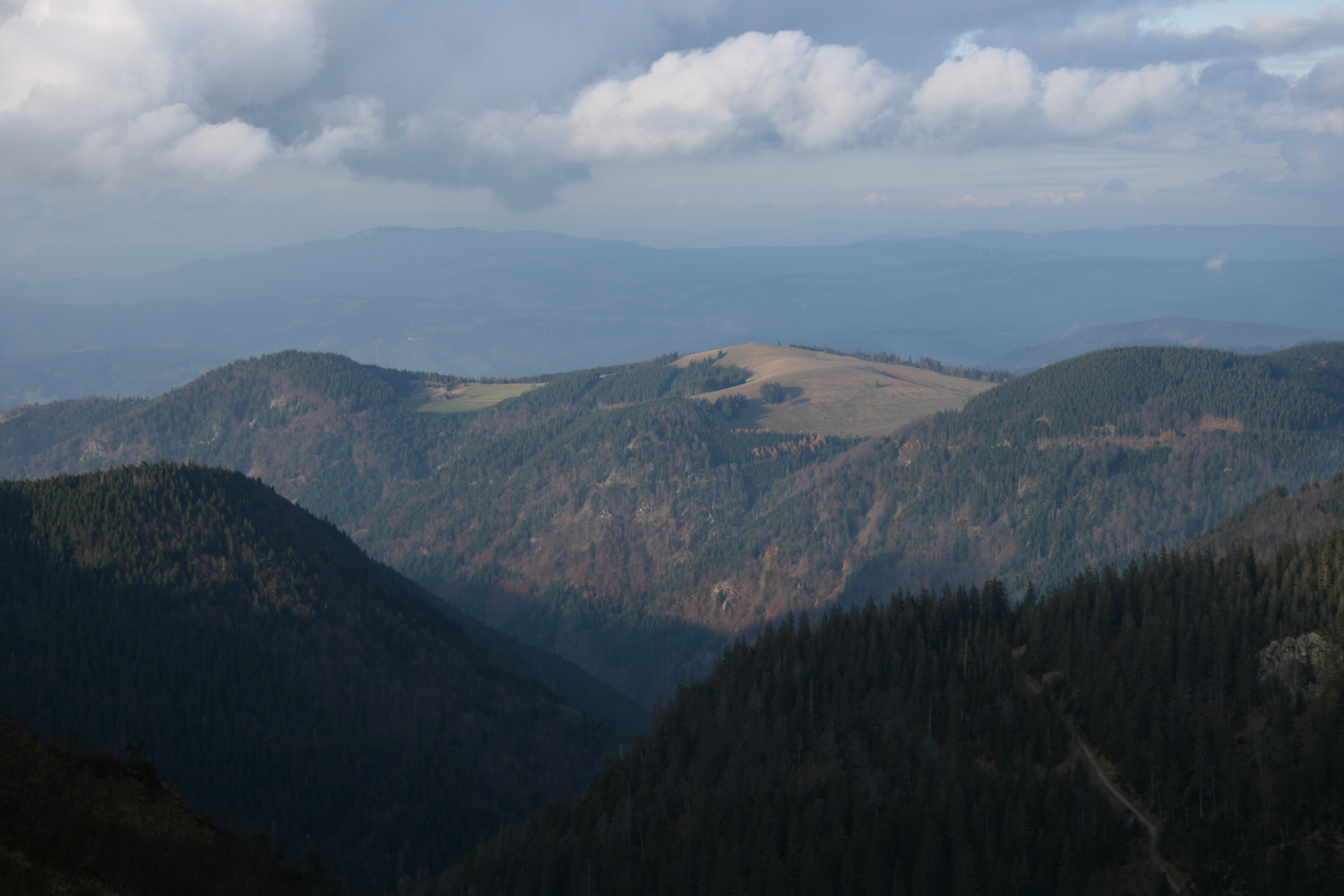
The Hinterwaldkopf

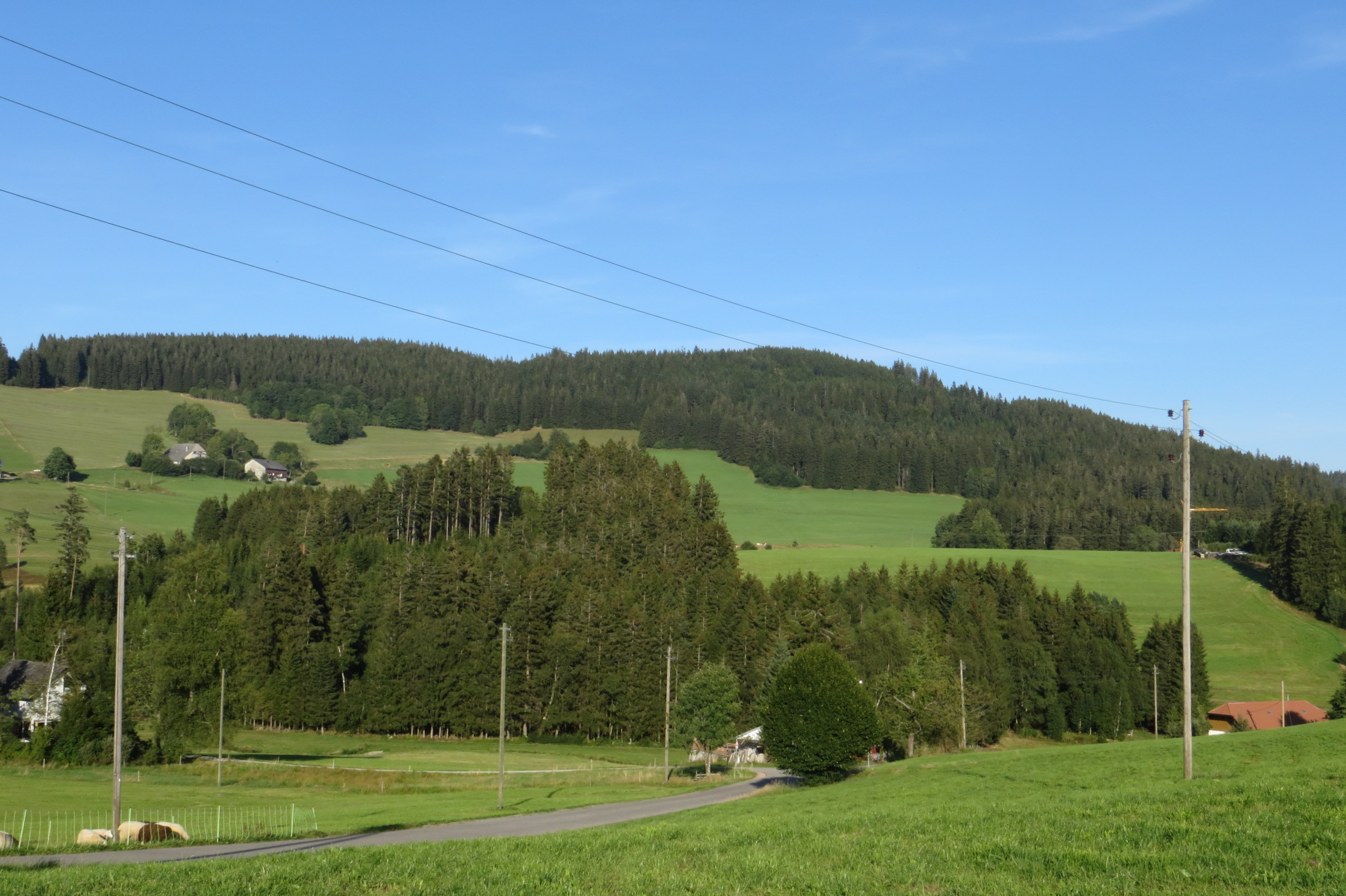
The Weißtannenhöhe

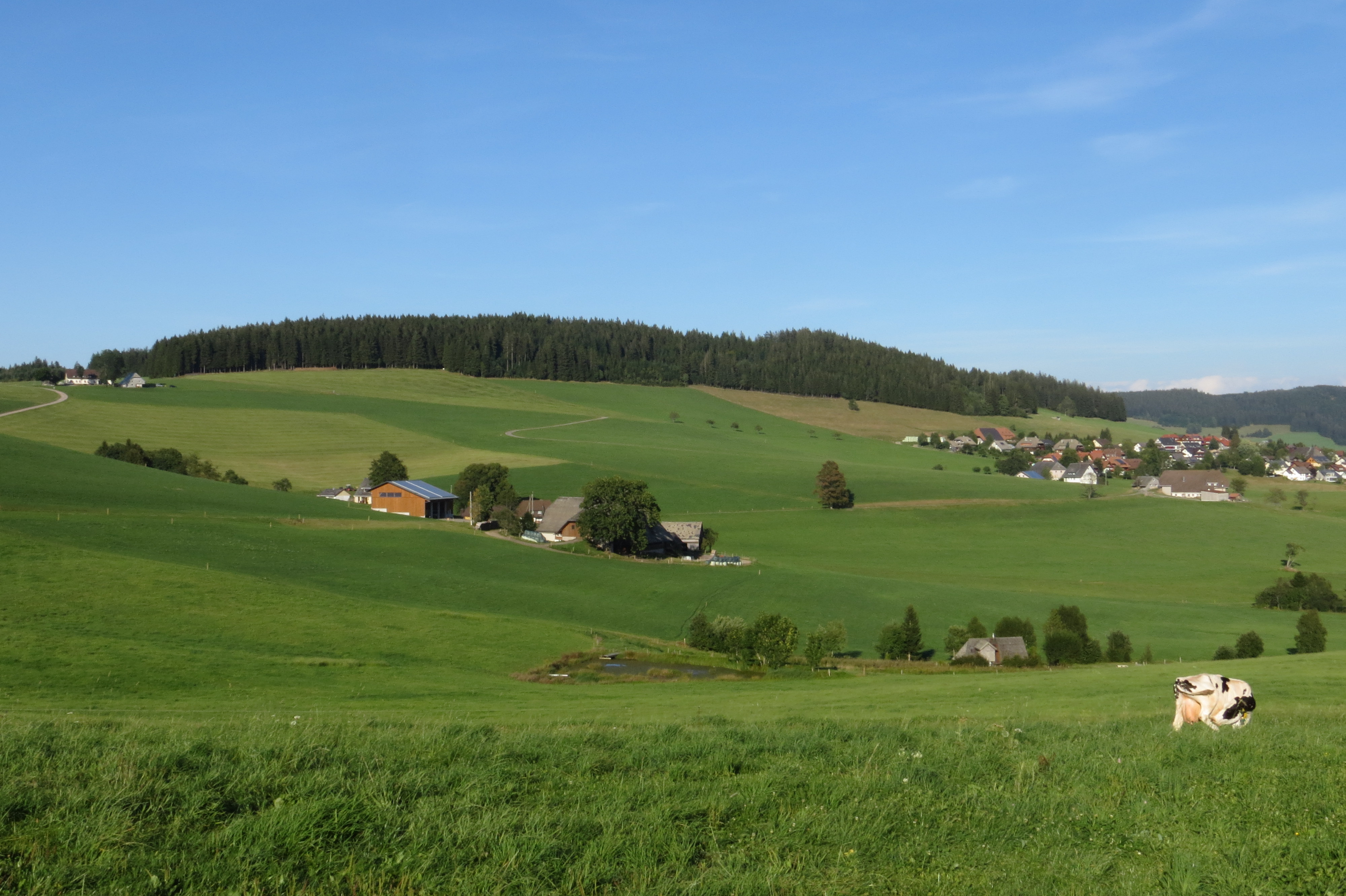
The Roßberg

- Hinterwaldkopf (1,198 m), between Oberried and Hinterzarten
- Hochfirst (1,190 m), 3 km east of the Titisee
- Weißtannenhöhe (1,190 m), 5 km north of the Titisee
- Wiedener Hörnle (1,187 m), between Notschrei and Wiedener Eck
- Obereck (1,177 m), 2 km southwest of the Rohrhardsberg (on the older maps the 1180 metre contour was shown)
- Griesbacher Eck (1,172 m), near the Obereck
- Dachsbühl (1,171 m), near the Erlenbach Hut
- Rohrenkopf (1,170 m), north of Gersbach
- Blauen (also Hochblauen; 1,165 m), southeast of Badenweiler
- Hornisgrinde (1,164 m), (highest mountain of the Northern Black Forest)
- Hasenhorn (1,156 m), 1 km southeast of Todtnau
- Kaiserberg (1,156 m), by Riggenbach in the municipality of Bernau
- Roteck (1,156 m), 1 km northwest of the Hinterwaldkopf
- Roßeck (1,154 m), 7 km northwest of Furtwangen
- Herrenschwander Kopf (1,152 m), 5 km southeast of Schönau
- Rohrhardsberg (1,152 m), between Elzach and Furtwangen
- Brend (1,149 m), 5 km northwest of Furtwangen
- Ibichkopf (1,146 m), 3 km subpeak of the Obereck
- Steinberg (1,141 m), 2 km northeast of Waldau
- Staldenkopf (1,135 m), 1.5 km south of Todtnau-Gschwend
- Bossenbühl (1,128 m), 2 km east of Waldau
- Roßberg (1,125 m), 500 m north of Breitnau
- Knöpflesbrunnen (1,124 m), 2 km west of Todtnau
- Hornkopf (1,121 m), 2 km south of Simonswald
- Hohwart (1,120 m), 2.5 km northwest of Breitnau
- Notschrei (1,119 m), pass between Oberried and Todtnau
- Eckle (1,114 m), between Hinterzarten and Feldberg-Bärental
- Sirnitzkopf (1,114 m), 7 km east of Badenweiler

== Over 1,000 m ==
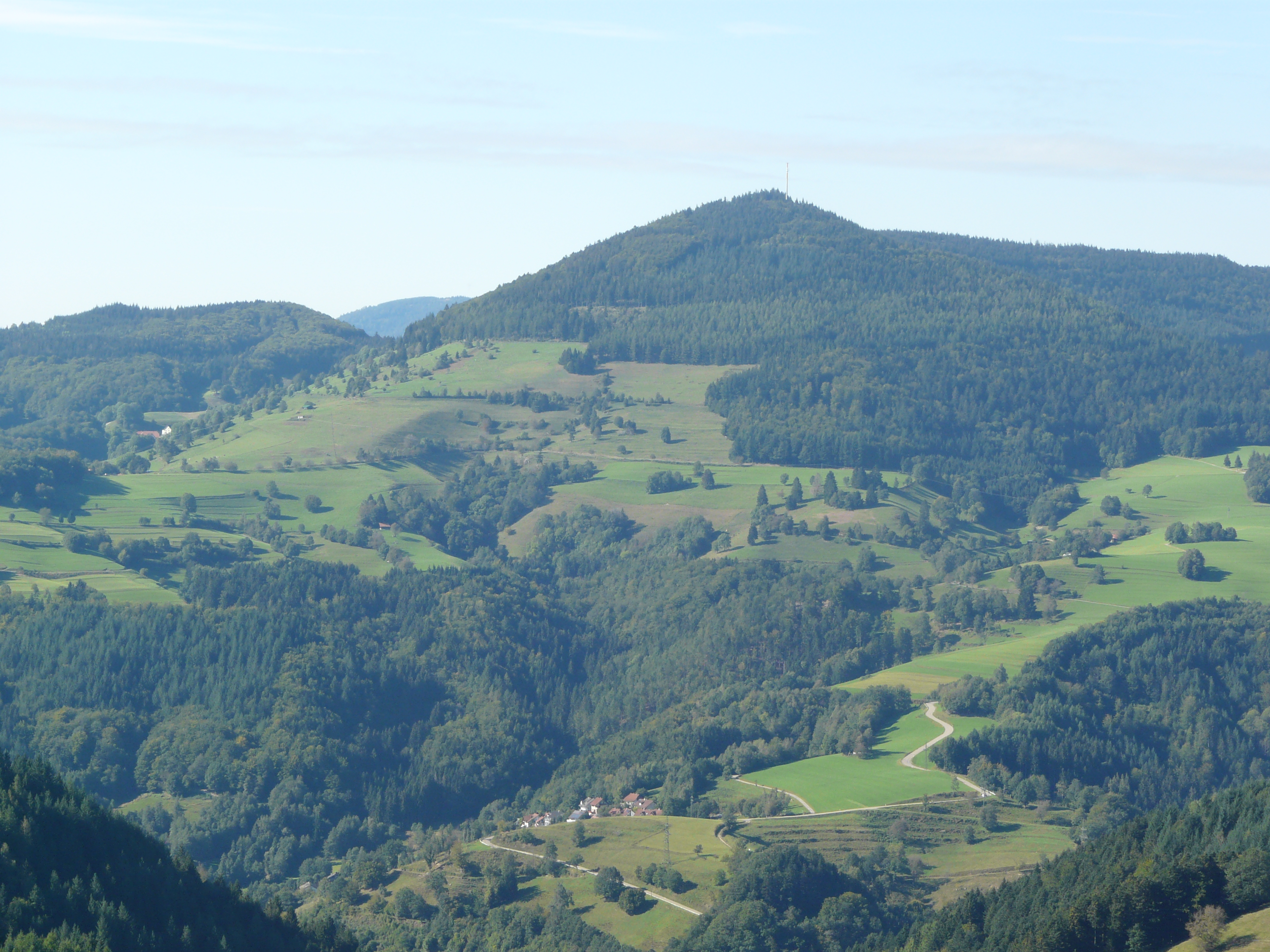
The Zeller Blauen

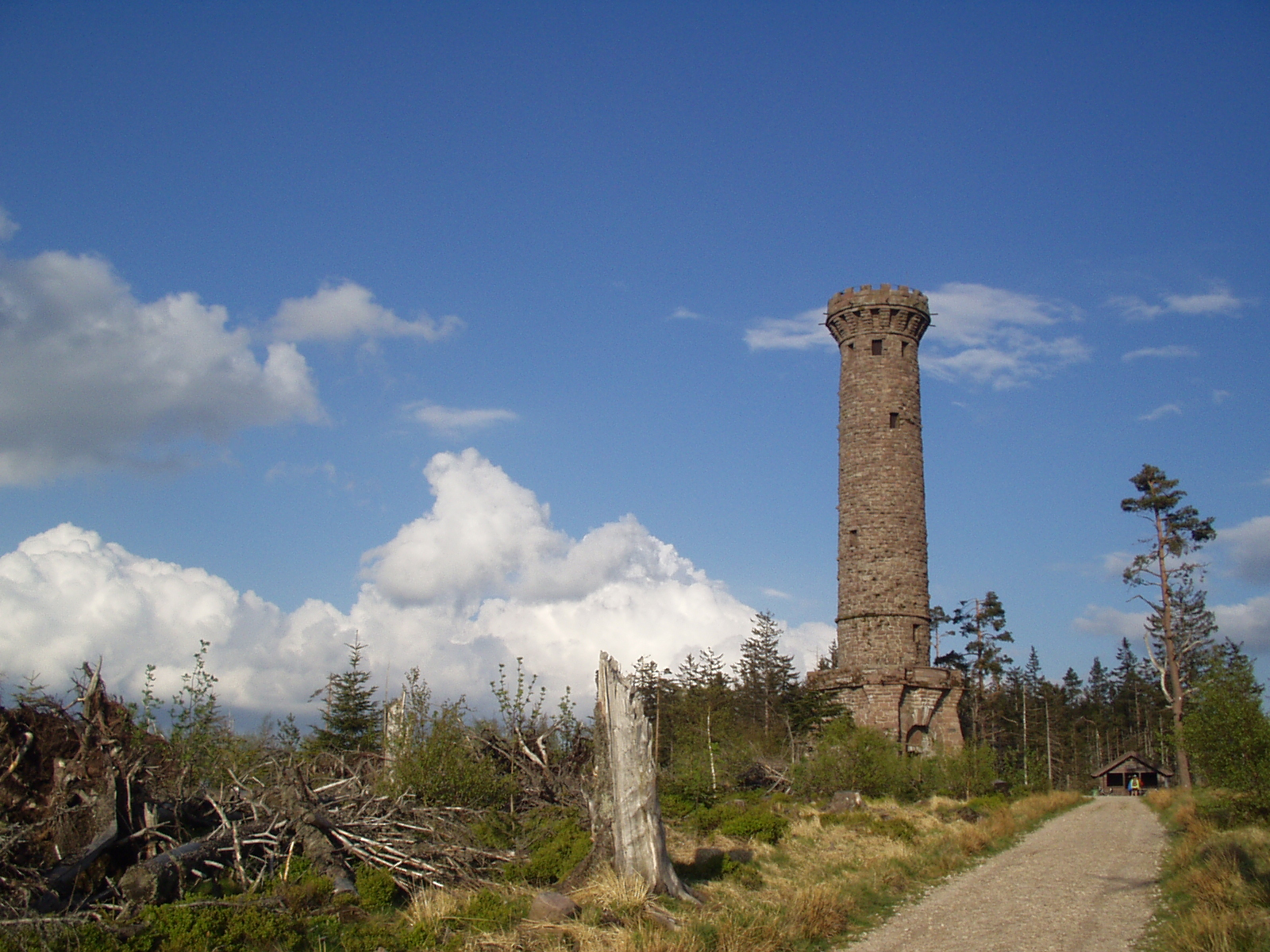
The Badener Höhe

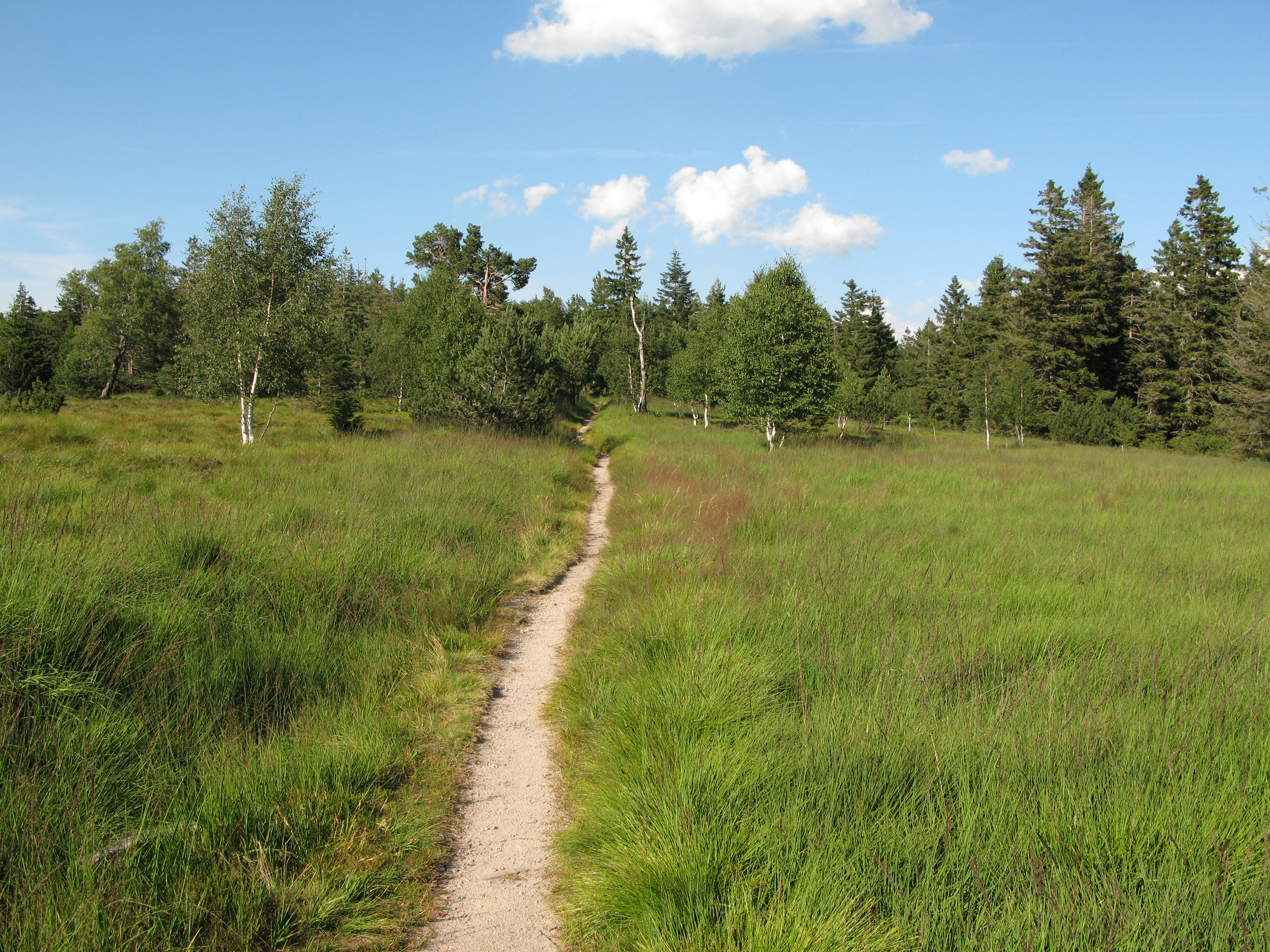
The Hochkopf

- Altsteigerskopf (1,092 m), 4 km southeast of the Hornisgrinde
- Geißkopf (1,090 m), 3.5 km southeast of the Hornisgrinde
- Tafelbühl (1,084 m), 3 km west of the Rohrhardsberg
- Hundsrücken (1,080 m), northeast of the Hornisgrinde
- Zeller Blauen (today more rarely the Hochblauen; 1,077 m), 3 km north of Zell i. W.
- Schultiskopf (1,077 m), 3 km east of Altsimonswald
- Sommerberg (1,076 m), 3 km southeast of Furtwangen
- Hohspirn (1,074 m), between Falkau and Lenzkirch-Raitenbuch
- Steiertenkopf (1,073 m), between Feldberg and Hinterzarten
- Schattann (1,067 m), 2.5 km west of Bürchau
- Stöcklewald (1,067 m), 5 km south of Triberg
- Schwarzkopf (1,057 m), south of the Hornisgrinde
- Vogelskopf (1,056 m), 5 km south of the Hornisgrinde
- Hoher Ochsenkopf (1,055 m), 6.5 km northeast of the Hornisgrinde, highest mountain in the county of Rastatt
- Schliffkopf (1,055 m), by the Black Forest High Road
- Seekopf (1,055 m), above Seebach (Baden), four kilometres southeast of the Hornisgrinde
- Bosberg (1,052 m)
- Geisberg (1,047 m), 3 km northeast of the Rohrhardsberg, near Schonach
- Gschasikopf (1,045 m), 6 km north of the Rohrhardsberg
- Otten (1,041 m), between Buchenbach and Breitnau
- Hochkopf (1,039 m), north of the Hornisgrinde
- Bubshorn (1,032 m), Fröhnd/Pfaffenberg
- Kesselberg (1,024 m), west of Oberkirnach (St. Georgen)
- Honeck (1,022 m), east of Bürchau
- Pfälzer Kopf (1,013 m), 6 km southeast of the Hornisgrinde
- Mehliskopf (1,008 m), above the Black Forest High Road
- Schlegelberg (1,005 m)
- Muhrkopf (1,003 m), 2 km north of the Hornisgrinde
- Badener Höhe (1,002.5 m), near Baden-Baden
- Seekopf (1,001.1 m), east of the Badener Höhe and ten kilometres northeast of the Hornisgrinde
- Riesenköpfle (1,000.8 m), 7.5 km southeast of the Hornisgrinde

== Up to 1,000 m ==
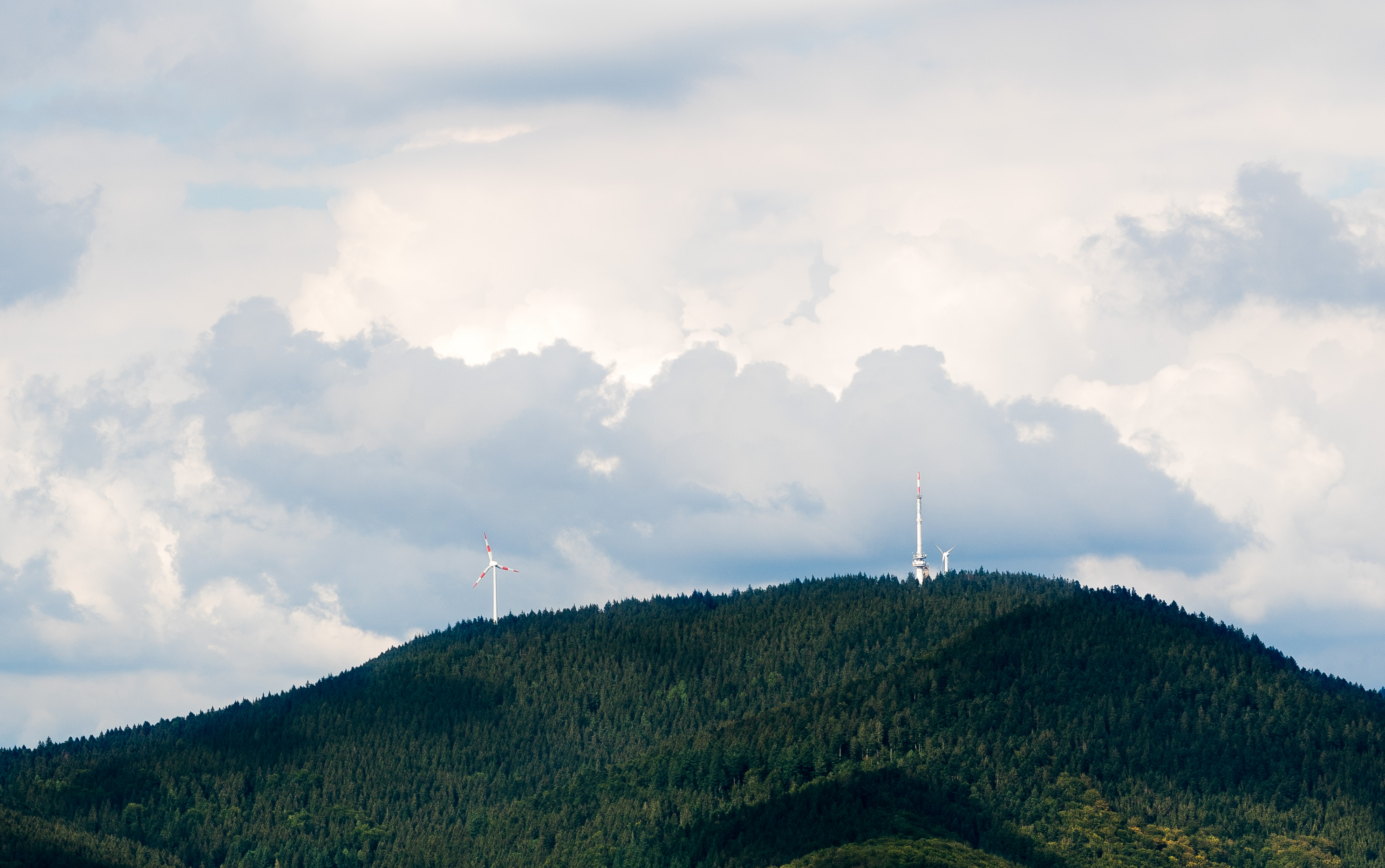
The Brandenkopf

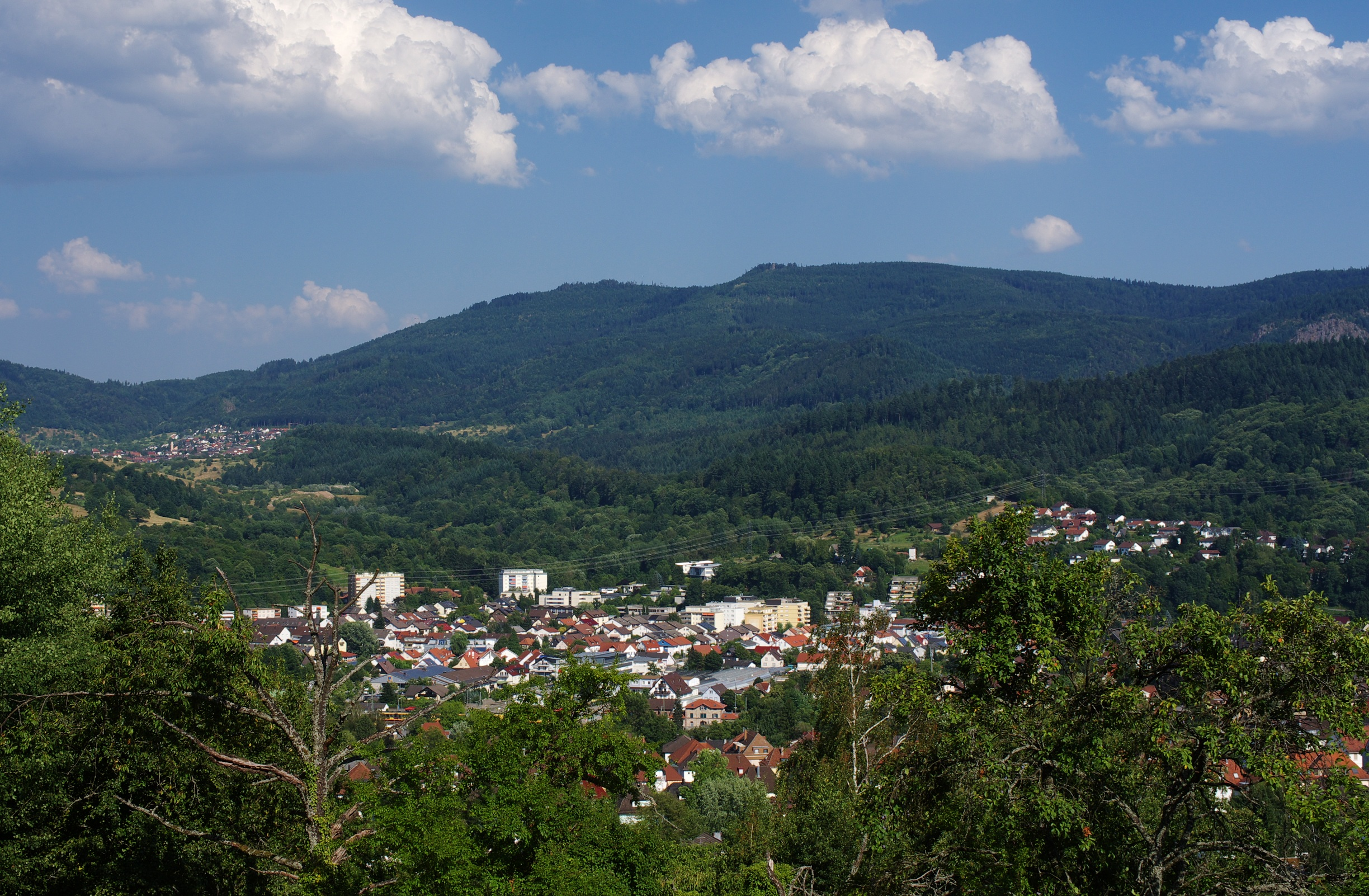
The Teufelsmühle

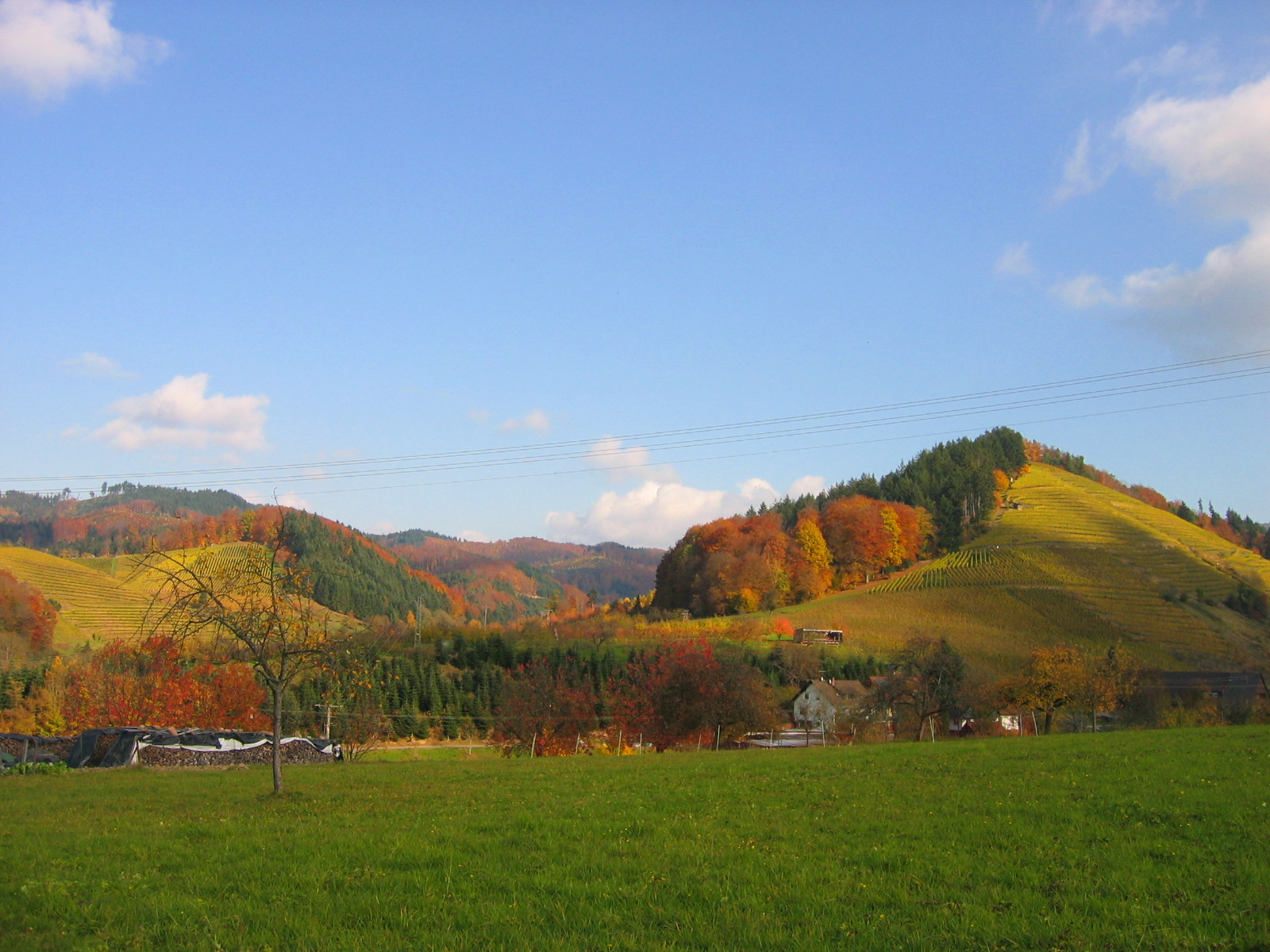
The Mooskopf

- Mühleberg (995 m), local mountain of Vöhrenbach
- Hohloh (988 m), near Gernsbach-Kaltenbronn
- Hohe Möhr (983 m), near Zell in the Wiesental
- Kniebis (971 m), near Freudenstadt
- Lettstädter Höhe (966 m), southwest of Kniebis
- Brandenkopf (945 m)
- Teufelsmühle (908 m), east of Gernsbach near Loffenau
- Hörnleberg (907 m)
- Mooskopf (877.5 m), highest point of Gengenbach
- Sulgener Berg (763.5 m), near Sulgen, Rottweil
- Rinkenkopf (759.6 m), near Baiersbronn
- Roßkopf (737 m), near Freiburg im Breisgau
- Bernstein (694 m), local mountain of Gaggenau
- Brandeckkopf (686 m), local mountain of Zell-Weierbach, Offenburg
- Merkur (668 m), local mountain of Baden-Baden
- Egenhäuser Kapf (625 m)
- Mahlberg (613 m), near Gaggenau, highest point in the county of Karlsruhe
- Battert (568 m), near Baden-Baden, with the well-known Battertfelsen climbing area
- Fremersberg (525 m), west of Baden-Baden
- Geißkopf (359 m), hill near Berghaupten with old military encampment
- Hornberg (356.5 m), hill in the Breisgau, near Kollmarsreute (Emmendingen), Emmendingen, Baden-Württemberg

== See also ==
- List of mountains of Baden-Württemberg
