= Hornberg (disambiguation) =

Hornberg is a city in Ortenaukreis, Baden-Württemberg, Germany.

Hornberg may also refer to:

== Places ==
- Hornberg (Altensteig), borough of Altensteig, county of Calw, Baden-Württemberg
- Hornberg (Cappel), village in the borough of Öhringen-Cappel, Hohenlohekreis, Baden-Württemberg, see Cappel (Öhringen)#History,
- Hornberg (Fichtenberg), village in the borough of Fichtenberg, Schwäbisch Hall, Baden-Württemberg
- Hornberg an der Jagst, part of Kirchberg an der Jagst, Schwäbisch Hall, Baden-Württemberg
- Hornberg (Herrischried), part of Herrischried, Waldshut, Baden-Württemberg
- Hornberg (Dimbach), village in Dimbach, Bezirk Perg, Upper Austria
- Hornberg (Höfen), village in Höfen, Bezirk Reutte, Tyrol
- Hornberg (Innervillgraten), village in Innervillgraten, Bezirk Lienz/East Tyrol, Tyrol
- Hornberg BE, region in the municipality of Saanen in the Swiss canton of Berne

== Structures ==
- Hornberg Castle (Neckarzimmern), castle in Neckarzimmern, Neckar-Odenwald-Kreis, Baden-Württemberg
- Hornberg Castle (Öhringen), built-over castle site in Cappel-Hornberg (Öhringen), Hohenlohekreis, Baden-Württemberg
- Hornberg Castle (Hornberg an der Jagst), palace-like castle site in Hornberg an der Jagst (Kirchberg an der Jagst), Schwäbisch Hall, Baden-Württemberg
- Hornberg Castle (Schwarzwald), palace ruins near the town of Hornberg, Ortenaukreis, Baden-Württemberg
- Althornberg Castle, castle site near Althornberg (Triberg im Schwarzwald), Schwarzwald-Baar-Kreis, Baden-Württemberg
- Hornberg Airfield, glider airfield on the Kalten Feld (Swabian Jura), near Degenfeld, Ostalbkreis, Baden-Württemberg

== Hills ==
- Hornberg (Swabian Jura), 697.9 m, in the Swabian Jura, near Degenfeld (Schwäbisch Gmünd), Ostalbkreis, Baden-Württemberg
- Hornberg (Virngrund), 580.0 m, highest hill in the Virngrund, near Ellenberg, Ostalbkreis, Baden-Württemberg
- Hornberg (Frankenhöhe), 554.0 m, highest summit in the Frankenhöhe, near Schnelldorf, Ansbach, Bavaria
- Hornberg (Abtsgmünd), 495.7 m, near Abtsgmünd in the Jura Foreland, Ostalbkreis, Baden-Württemberg
- Hornberg (Dautphetal), 451.0 m, in the Damshäusen Kuppen, near Friedensdorf (Dautphetal), Marburg-Biedenkopf, Hesse
- Hornberg (Breisgau), 356.5 m, in the Breisgau, near Kollmarsreute (Emmendingen), Emmendingen, Baden-Württemberg
- Hornberg (Framersheim) (273.3 m), in the Alzey Hills, near Framersheim, Alzey-Worms, Rhineland-Palatinate

== See also ==
- Hornburg (disambiguation)
- Hornberger
