= Hochkopf =

Hochkopf may refer to:

- Hochkopf (Northern Black Forest), a mountain in the Black Forest, Germany
- Hochkopf (Southern Black Forest), a wooded ridge in the Black Forest, Germany
