= Zell-Weierbach =

- District
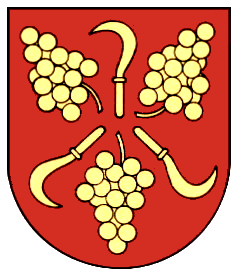
- Interactive map of Zell-Weierbach
- Coordinates: 48°29′N 07°59′E
- Country: Germany
- Federal state: Baden-Württemberg
- City: Offenburg

Area
  - Total: 7.97 km^{2} (3.08 sq mi)
- Highest elevation: 649 m (2,129 ft)
- Lowest elevation: 180 m (590 ft)

Population
  - Total: 3,529 (2,016/12)
  - Density: 443/km^{2} (1,150/sq mi)
- Postal code: 77654
- Area code: 0781

Zell-Weierbach is a district of Offenburg, Germany.

== Geography ==
Zell-Weierbach is located in the foothills of the Black Forest, at a distance of 1 km from downtown Offenburg, in between the two wine villages Rammersweier and Fessenbach. The 7.79 km² big neighborhood are subdivided into 3.55 km² woodland, 1.21 km² fields and meadows, and 1.01 km² wine country. 1.83 km² are built on, while 0.37 km² are taken up by waters, sports fields, and leisure facilities.

== History ==
Weyerbach was first mentioned in a document in 1235. Later names of the place were Wygerbach (1289) and Wigerbach (1447). In 1241, Celle was first mentioned in documents. Later spellings would be Zell (1367) and Zelle (1400). In 1551, Zell, Weierbach, and Riedle, together with Ortenau, became part of the Further Austria. The three localities became part of Baden in 1805. In 1811, the so-called Zeller Stab (consolidation of villages) was broken up. The communities Zell, Weierbach, Riedle, Fessenbach and Oberrammersweier were all part of the Zeller Stab. The disbanding of the consolidation was the consequence of a request of Oberrammersweier to separate from the Zeller Stab. Consequently, on July 15, 1820, the three communities, Zell, Weierbach, and Riedle upon request were combined to become known under the name of Zell-Weierbach. In 1850, some citizens of Zell emigrated to Missouri in the U.S., to the Ste. Genevieve County of today, because of an economical crisis in Zell. Ste. Genevieve County is located around 60 miles south of St. Louis. On January 1, 1971, Zell-Weierbach was suburbanized in the city of Offenburg during the local government reorganization.

== Viticulture ==
Zell-Weierbach's vintner's cooperative, which was founded in 1923 is famous for its wines, in particular the Zeller Abtsberg, a Spätburgunder (engl. pinot noir) red wine. Other types of vines are: Riesling (white grape variety with flowery aromas and high acidity), Müller-Thurgau (white grape variety; crossing of Riesling and Madeleine Royale), and Ruländer (engl. pinot gris; white wine grape, mutant of the pinot noir variety). The Badische Weinstraße (tourist itinerary of around 500 km in the south-west of Germany) runs through the locality.

== Sights ==
The Schulmuseum Zell-Weierbach (engl. school museum) was founded in 1996. The exhibition is based on a collection by the school inspector Jupp Wunderle, which was started in the 1970s. Among the rooms that can be visited are a former teacher's flat in the school building, a sewing room with numerous handcrafts, as well as a library with about 13 000 school books from the past three centuries. In 2005 the museum was renamed the Museum for the former Grand Ducal Baden Schools.

The Zeller Barefoot Path is a hiking trail that aims to motivate people to walk barefoot in the forest. The so-called Wolfsgrube has an outdoor enclosure with a petting zoo.

The Brandeckturm is a lookout tower on the summit of the 686 meter high Brandeckkopf in the middle of the Brandeck landscape protection area. Today nothing remains of Bielenstein Castle, which was destroyed in the 16th century.
