= Hornberger =

Hornberger is a surname. Notable people and fictional characters with the surname include:

== People ==
- Gerd Hornberger (1910–1988), Olympic German athlete who competed in the 1936 Summer Olympics
- H. Richard Hornberger (1924–1997), American writer and surgeon.
- Raymond Hornberger (1898–1976), American soccer player

== Fictional characters ==
- Pete Hornberger, in American TV series 30 Rock

== See also ==
- Hornberg (disambiguation)
