= Hornberg (Dautphetal) =

Coordinates: 50°50′22″N 8°33′23″E

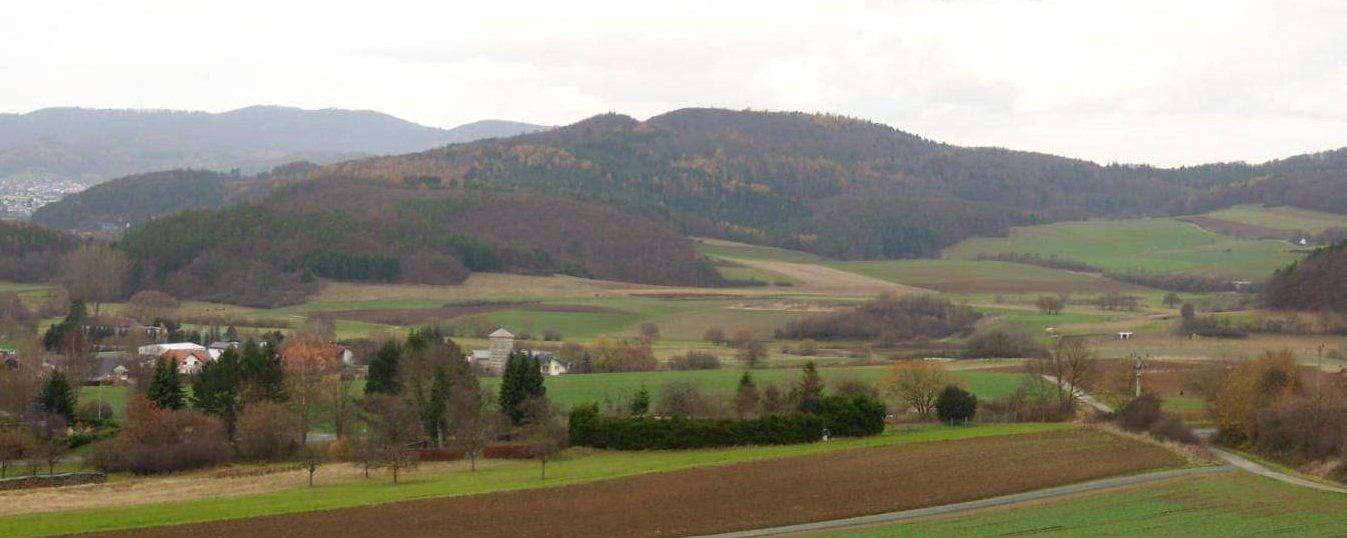

Highest point
- Elevation: 451 m (1,480 ft)

Geography
- Location: Hesse, Germany

Hornberg is a hill of Hesse, Germany.
