= Sulgener Berg =

- Location within Baden-Württemberg

Highest point
- Elevation: 763.5 m above sea level (NHN) (2,505 ft)
- Coordinates: 48°13′3″N 8°24′57.7″E

Geography
- Location: in Sulgen; Rottweil, Baden-Württemberg (Germany)
- Parent range: Black Forest

Climbing
- Access: Wohngebietsstraßen bis zur Gipfelregion

The Sulgener Berg, also called the Sulger Berg, is a mountain, 763.5 m above sea level (NHN), in the Black Forest in Germany. It is located near Sulgen (also on the Sulgen), a village in the borough of Schramberg in the Baden-Württemberg county of Rottweil. It lies within the Central/North Black Forest Nature Park.

The Sulgener Berg, which rises south of the village of Sulgen and west of the hamlet of Schoren, is often associated with the hamlet of Hutneck to the south and referred to as Sulgen's local mountain. At the top is the Sulgen Water Tower, which was built in 1960. Until its incorporation into the municipality of Tennenbronn in 2006 the mountain was one of the highest points in the parish of Schramberg. In 1875 the Vogthof of Sulgener Berg was built on the mountain. On the same site today is the hotel restaurant of Drei Könige.

== Sources ==
- Stadt Schramberg (publ.): Das ist Schramberg. Die Uhren- und Fünftälerstadt im Schwarzwald. Schramberg, 1967.
- Topographic map, 1:50,000 scale, Schramberg, 1981 edition.
