= Teufelsmühle (Black Forest) =

Mountain in Germany

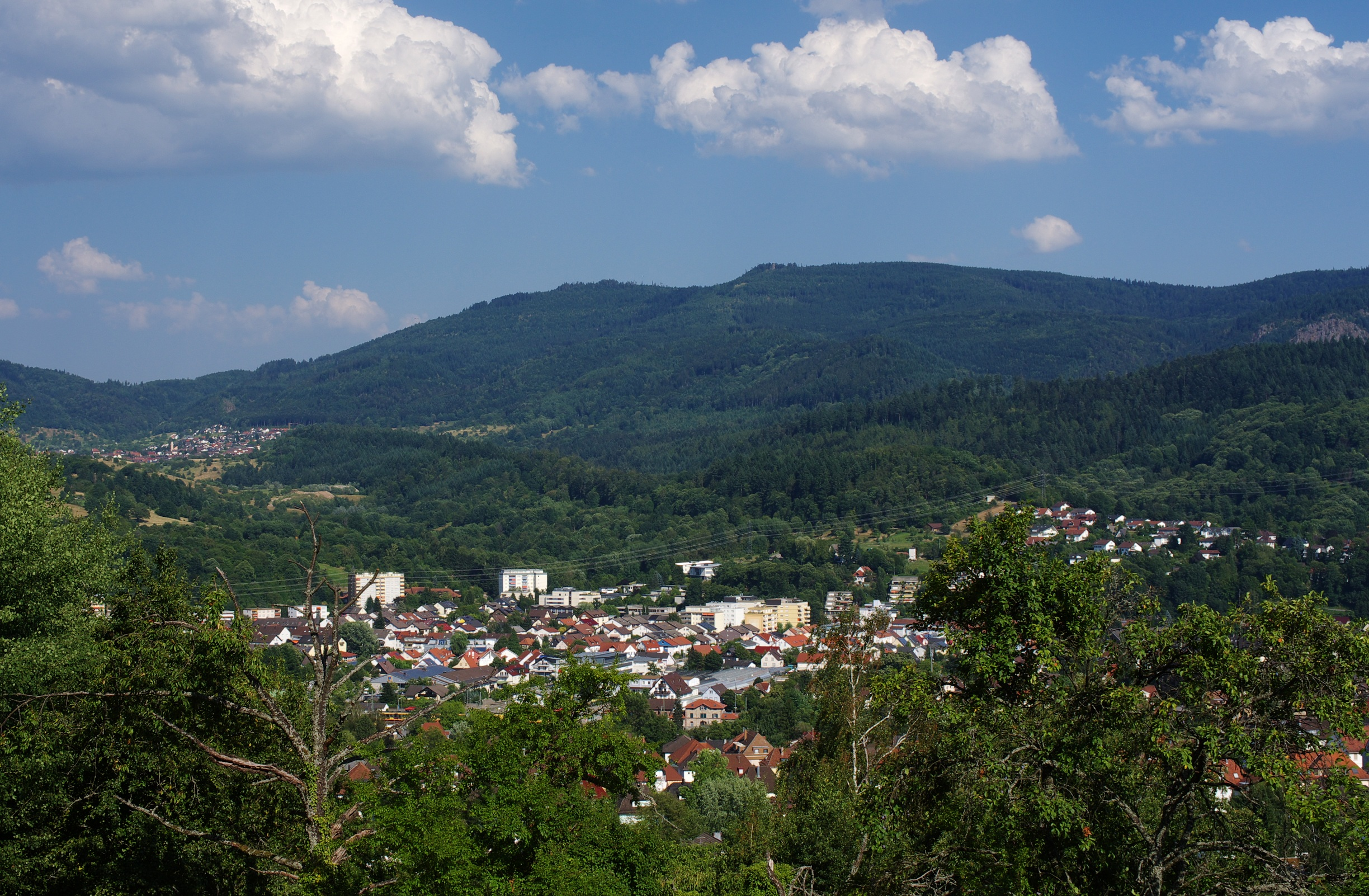
- View over Gernsbach to the Teufelsmühle. Left rear: Loffenau.

Highest point
- Elevation: 908 m above sea level (NHN) (2,979 ft)
- Coordinates: 48°45′14″N 8°24′30″E

Geography
- Location within Baden-Württemberg
- Location: Baden-Württemberg, Germany
- Parent range: Black Forest

The Teufelsmühle (908.1 m above sea level (NHN)) is a mountain south of Loffenau in the Northern Black Forest. It lies between the valleys of the Murg in the west and the Alb in the east. The Alb rises near the eastern flank of the mountain (at the Albursprung), before reaching Bad Herrenalb a few kilometres further north. Over the summit plateau of the Teufelsmühle, which runs in a north–south direction, runs the boundary between the municipalities of Gernsbach in the Murg valley and Loffenau, both of which belong to the Baden-Württemberg county of Rastatt.

== Infrastructure ==
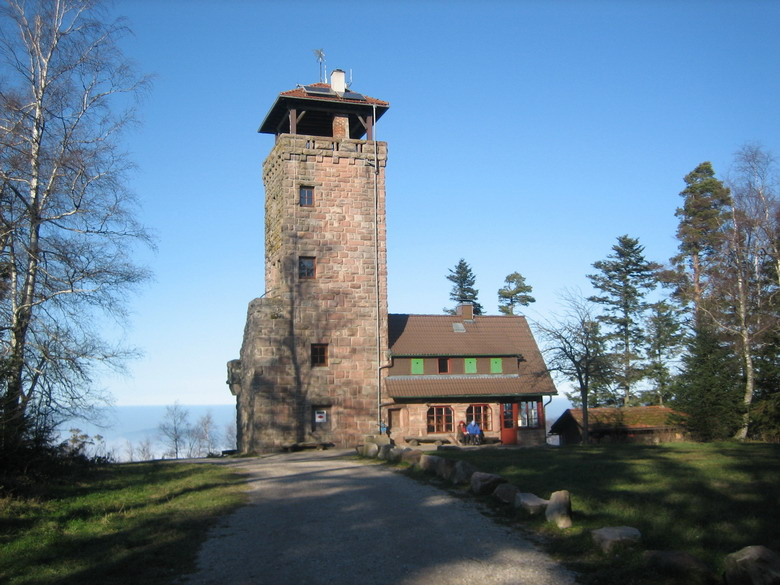
Excursion inn on the summit plateau

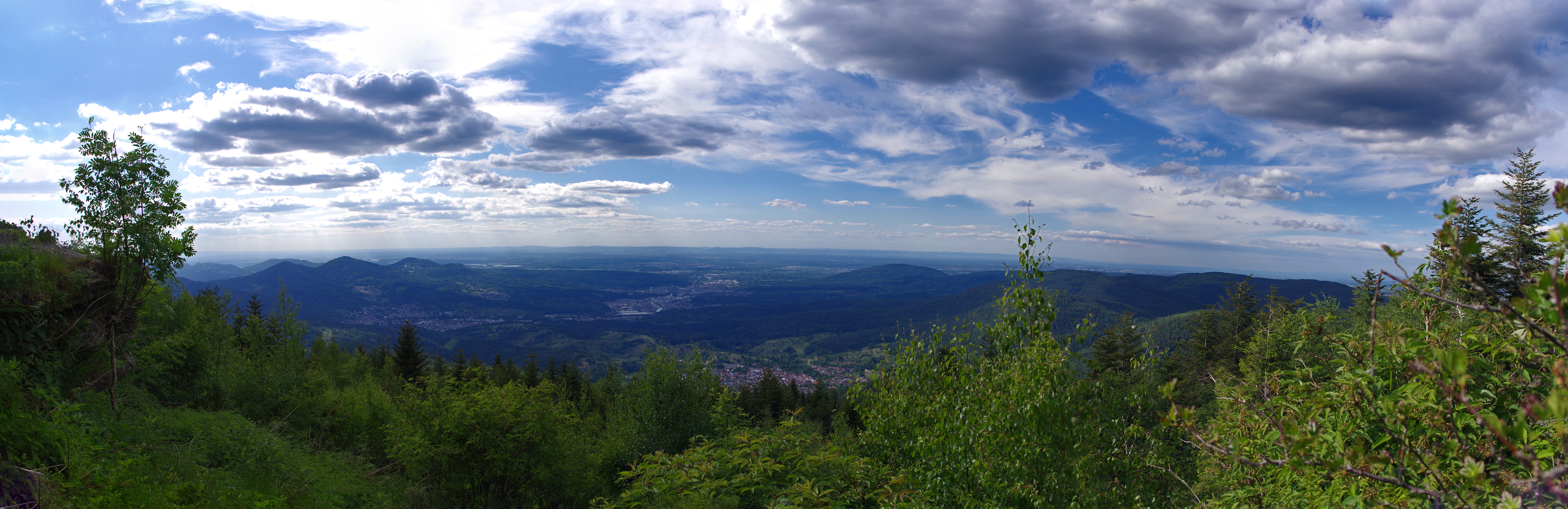
View to the Northwest - sitting on a stone - from Loffenau to Rhine Valley

In 1910, the Teufelsmühle Tower was erected on the summit plateau, which stood 10 metres high. In 1952, the observation tower was raised to a height of 16.2 metres. In 1958, a building was added that was eventually expanded into a hiker's inn. Not far from the tower stand the Teufelsmühle mountain inn. Together the building and the guest house of Teufelsmühle form a hamlet in the municipality of Loffenau. It is accessible by motor vehicles on a minor road from Rißwasen. The mountain is a base for walks and mountain bike tours. Below the observation tower at a height of 850 m above NHN is a launch site for the Loffenau Hang Gliding Club (Drachenflugclub Loffenau) which it has operated since 1977 and is used by hang gliders and, today, also by paragliders. The landing zone is 550 metres below at Loffenau.

On the Teufelsmühle Tower is a plaque with a picture of Hubertus Waldteufel, a local poet, whose real name was Emil Dietz and who lived from 1879 to 1957, ending his days in Bad Herrenalb-Zieflensberg. The Waldteufel Way (Waldteufelweg) in Upper Gaistal is named after him.

== Name ==
The Teufelsmühle does not get its name (which means "Devil's Mill") from an actual mill, but a popular interpretation of the glacial stone run found here. In the absence of a nearby rock massif and without knowing about the transportation of large boulders by prehistoric glaciers, the existence of large boulders is difficult to explain. So according to legend the scattered boulders were blocks from a former mill built by the devil.
