= Zeller Blauen =

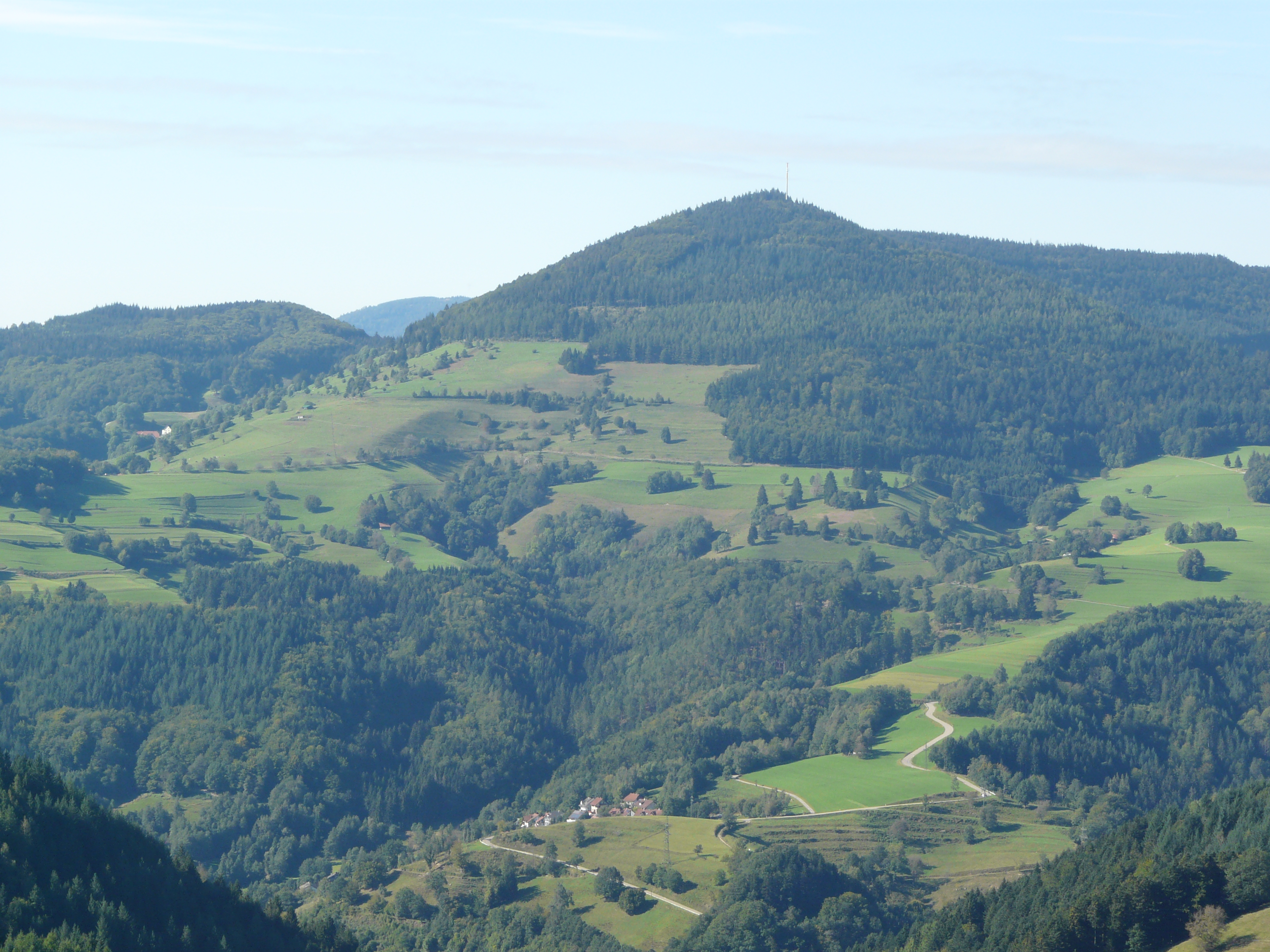
- The Zeller Blauen from the southwest

Highest point
- Elevation: 1,077.1 m above sea level (NHN) (3,534 ft)
- Coordinates: 47°44′03″N 7°51′06″E

Geography
- Location within Baden-Württemberg
- Location: Baden-Württemberg, Germany
- Parent range: Black Forest

The Zeller Blauen (more rarely: Hochblauen) is a mountain, 1,077.1 m above sea level (NHN), in the southern Black Forest in Germany. It belongs to Zell im Wiesental in the Baden-Württemberg county of Lörrach.

The mountain, with its steep slopes to the south, west and east, dominates the Wiese valley north of the town of Zell and towers above it by more than 600 metres. To the north a ridge runs from the forested summit region of the Zeller Blauen, between the Kleines Wiesental in the west and the Wiesental in the east, to the Belchen 10 kilometres away.

Along the southern flank of the Zeller Blauen are the remains of military earthworks. On the west mountainside, at an elevation of about 700 to 800 metres in the parish of Adelsberg, are the hamlets of Blauen and Oberblauen.

In a 1788 Black Forest map at St. Blaise Abbey the mountain is annotated as "auf dem hohen Blauen" ("on the high Blauen"). In the 1846 atlas, Topographischen Atlas ueber das Grossherzogtum Baden, it is called "Hochblauen". This description is also common for the mountain of Blauen, twelve kilometres away to the west-northwest.

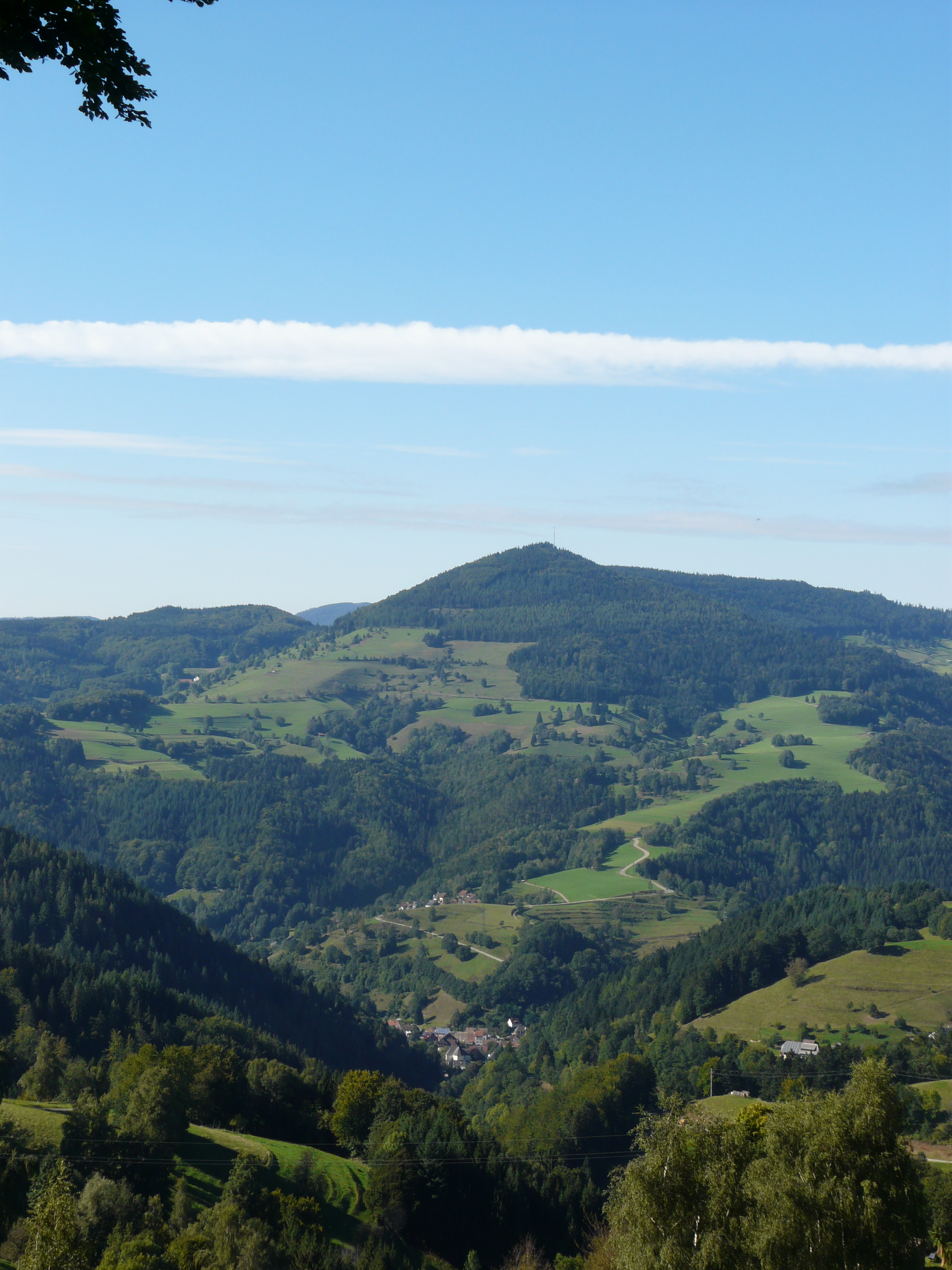
View from South

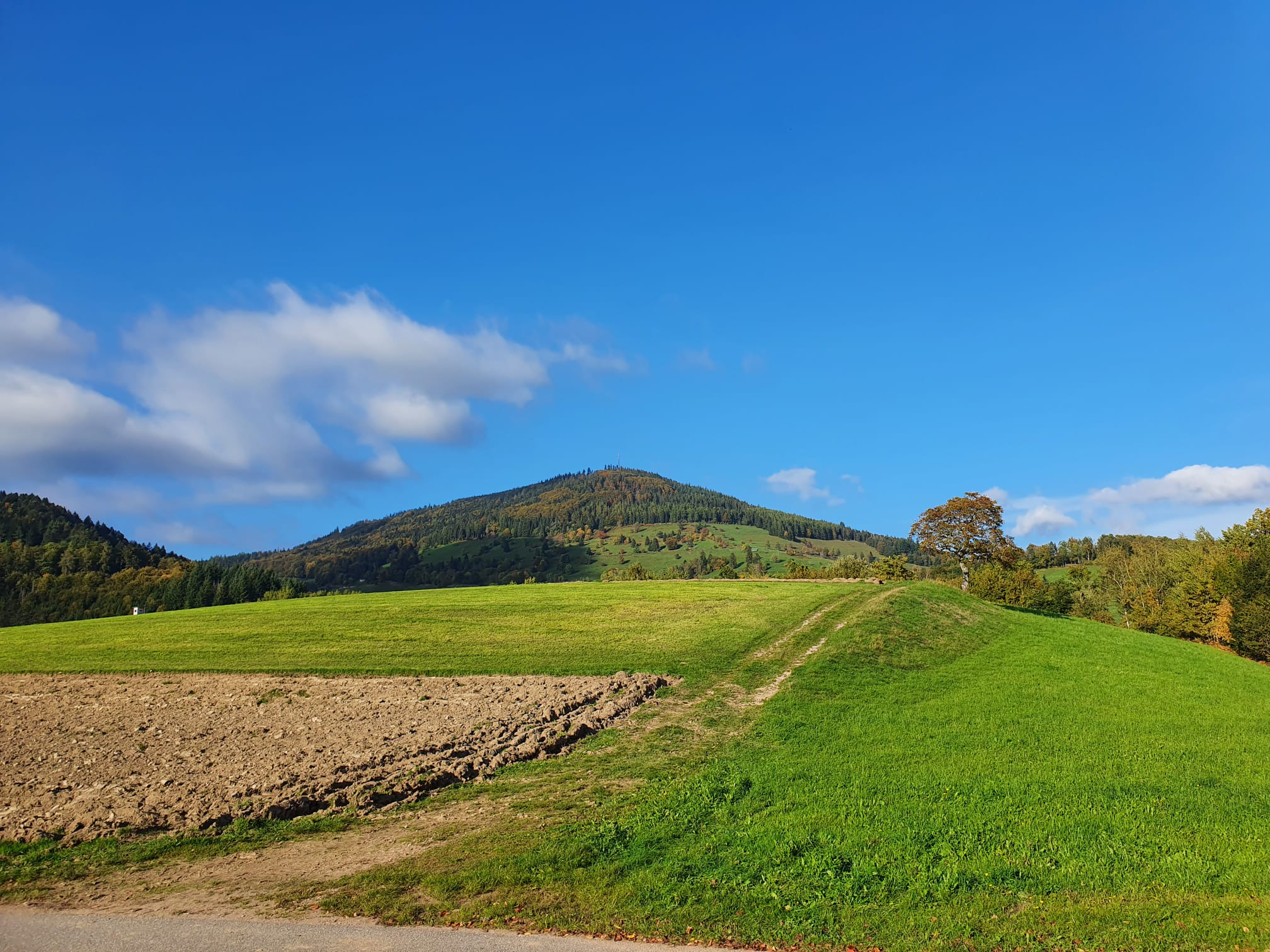
View from Southwest (Adelsberg)

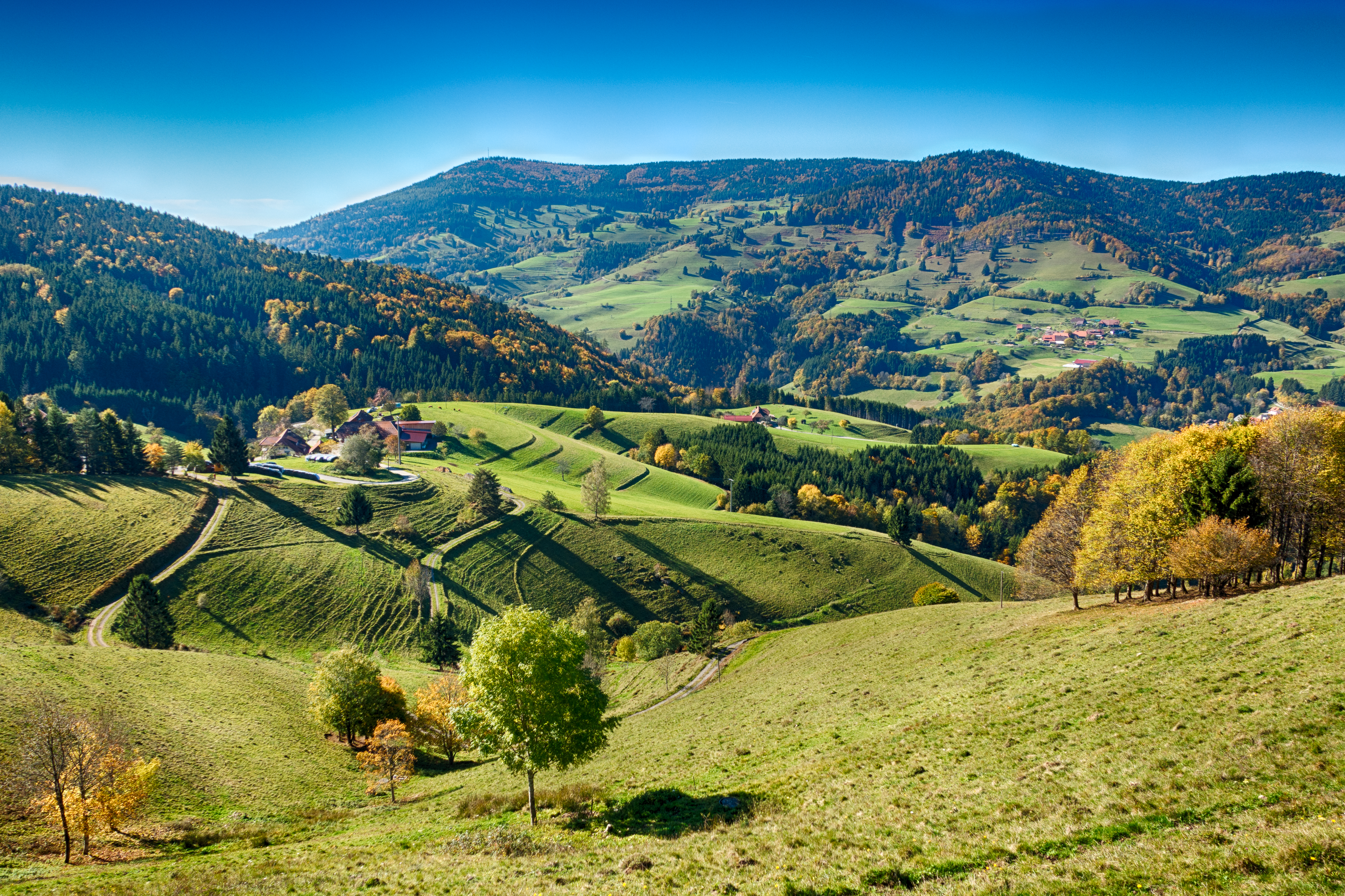
View from Northeast
