= Hornburg (disambiguation) =

Hornburg is a town in Lower Saxony, Germany.

Hornburg may also refer to :

- Hornburg, Saxony-Anhalt, part of Seegebiet Mansfelder Land municipality, Germany
- The Hornburg, Tolkien's fictional fortress in the Battle of Helm's Deep
- Michael Hornburg (born 1960), an American writer
