= Hochkopf (Southern Black Forest) =

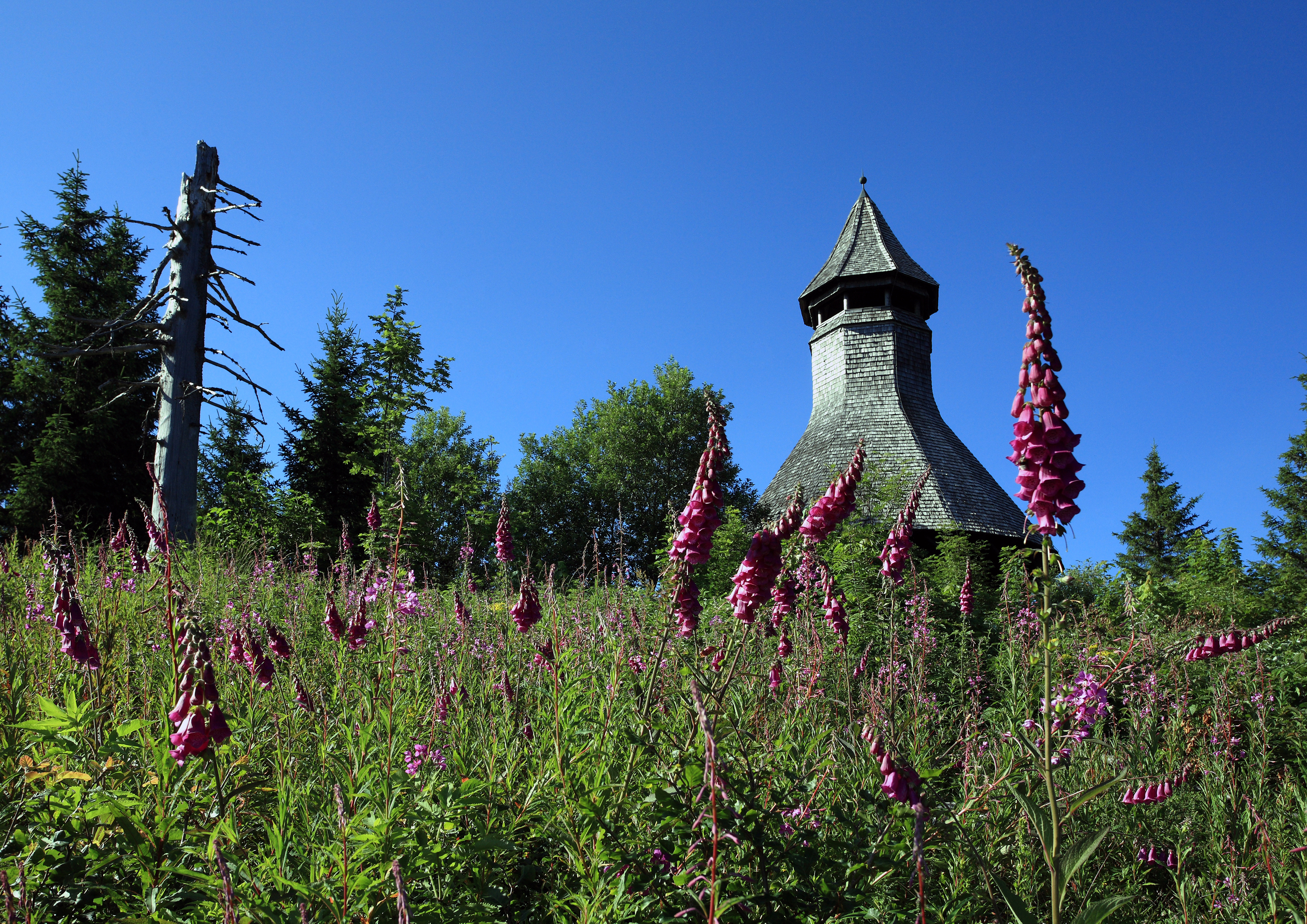
- Observation tower on the summit of the Hochkopf

Highest point
- Elevation: 1,263 m above sea level (NHN) (4,144 ft)
- Coordinates: 47°46′02″N 7°59′13″E

Geography
- Location within Baden-Württemberg
- Location: Todtmoos/Präg, Baden-Württemberg, Germany
- Parent range: Black Forest

The Hochkopf is a wooded ridge north of the village of Todtmoos in the southern part of the High Black Forest. At 1,263.4 m above sea level (NHN) its summit is one of the 20 highest points in the German state of Baden-Württemberg.

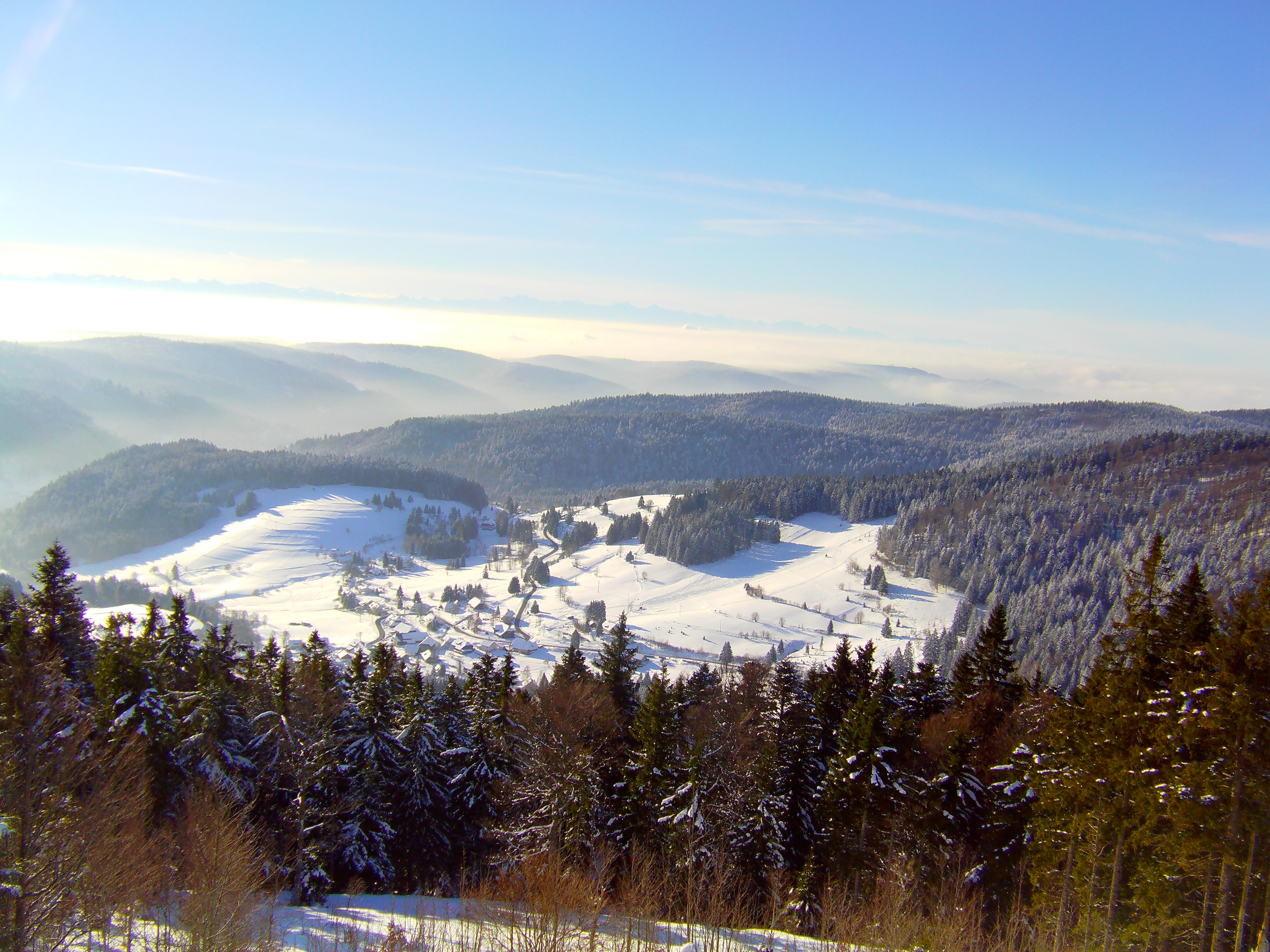
View from the Hochkopf looking south

The boundary between Todtmoos and the village of Präg in the borough of Todtnau runs over the mountain. The Hochkopf forms an east-west mountain ridge that forms the southern side of the Präg Cirque. Above the walls of the cirque the mountain ridges are as sharp as aretes in places.

The region around the Hochkopf is especially quiet and peaceful. On the summit of the Hochkopf a small observation tower, the Hochkopf Tower (Hochkopfturm) was built in 1925. Further down the mountain on the West Way (eastern route) stands the Hochkopfhaus, formerly a hiking hut owned by the Black Forest Club, but today a private hotel.

During weather inversions here there are clear views of the Alps from the Zugspitze to Mont Blanc. The Hochkopf is thus frequented as an alternative to the often overrun peaks of Feldberg and Belchen.
