= Hornberg (Breisgau) =

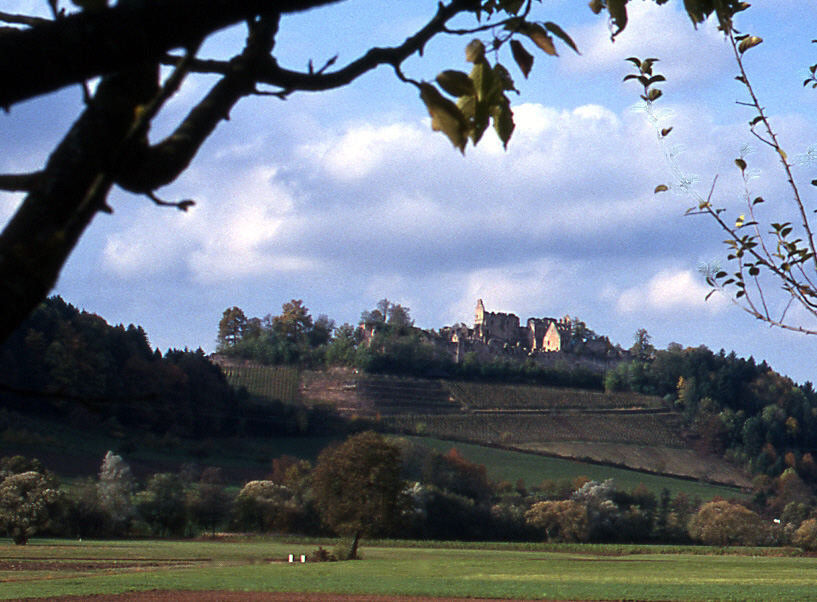
- The Hochburg on the Hornberg

Highest point
- Elevation: 356.5 m above sea level (NHN) (1,170 ft)
- Listing: Highest point in Baden-Baden
- Coordinates: 48°06′30″N 07°53′53″E

Geography
- Location within Baden-Württemberg
- Location: Baden-Württemberg, Germany
- Parent range: Black Forest

The Hornberg is a hill in the northern Breisgau in Baden-Württemberg, Germany. It is an outlier of the Black Forest, running as a north-south ridge between the villages of Windenreute, Kollmarsreute and Sexau into the Upper Rhine Plain. At its northern end is the Hochburg, one of the largest fortresses in South Baden. At its highest point the Hornberg almost reaches a height of 357 metres.
