= Hochkopf (Northern Black Forest) =

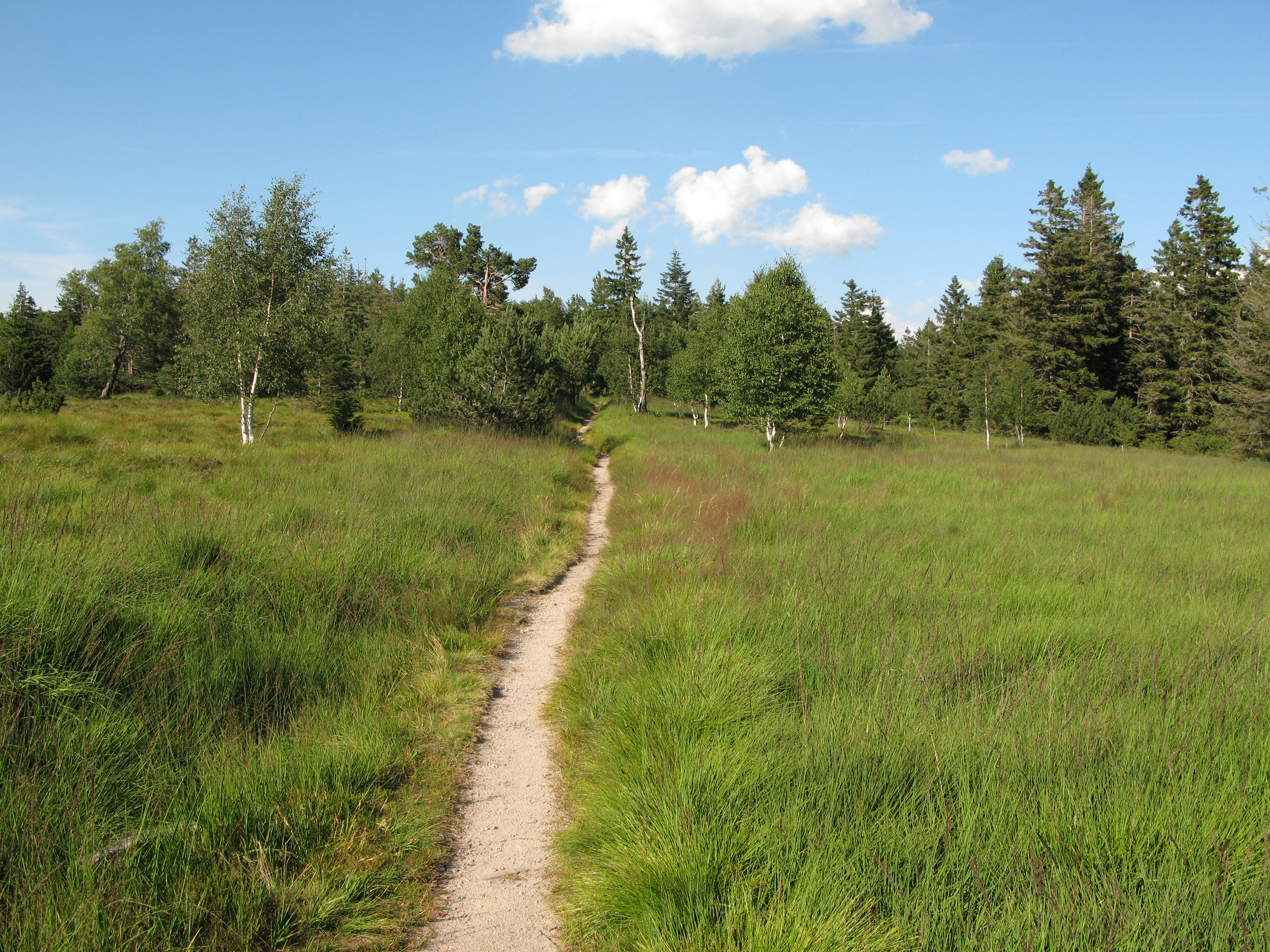
- Grinde landscape on the Hochkopf and Pfrimmackerkopf. Seen from the south.

Highest point
- Elevation: 1,038.3 m above sea level (NHN) (3,406 ft)
- Coordinates: 48°38′09″N 8°12′31″E

Geography
- Location within Baden-Württemberg
- Location: Rastatt, Baden-Württemberg, Germany
- Parent range: Black Forest

The Hochkopf is a mountain in the county of Rastatt in the Black Forest in Germany with height of 1,038.3 m above sea level (NHN). It is located northeast of the nearby Hornisgrinde, the highest mountain of the Northern Black Forest. About 700 metres away to the north, as part of the same mountain ridge, is the Pfrimmackerkopf (1,035.7 m above NHN). The plateau with its semi-protected forest or Schonwald, is a grinde, an open highland landscape typical of the Northern Black Forest, and is part of the Bühlertal conservation area.

== Tourism ==
On the north and west sides of the Hochkopfs, at height of about 900 metres, runs the B 500 federal highway, the Black Forest High Road, from Hundseck (884 m) to Unterstmatt (928 m), two former sites of highland hotels on the holiday route. From there the mountain is linked by footpaths. At Unterstmatt, on the southern slopes of the mountain is a ski piste with a lift, the Hochkopf Ski Lift (Skilift Hochkopf).
