= Brandeckkopf =

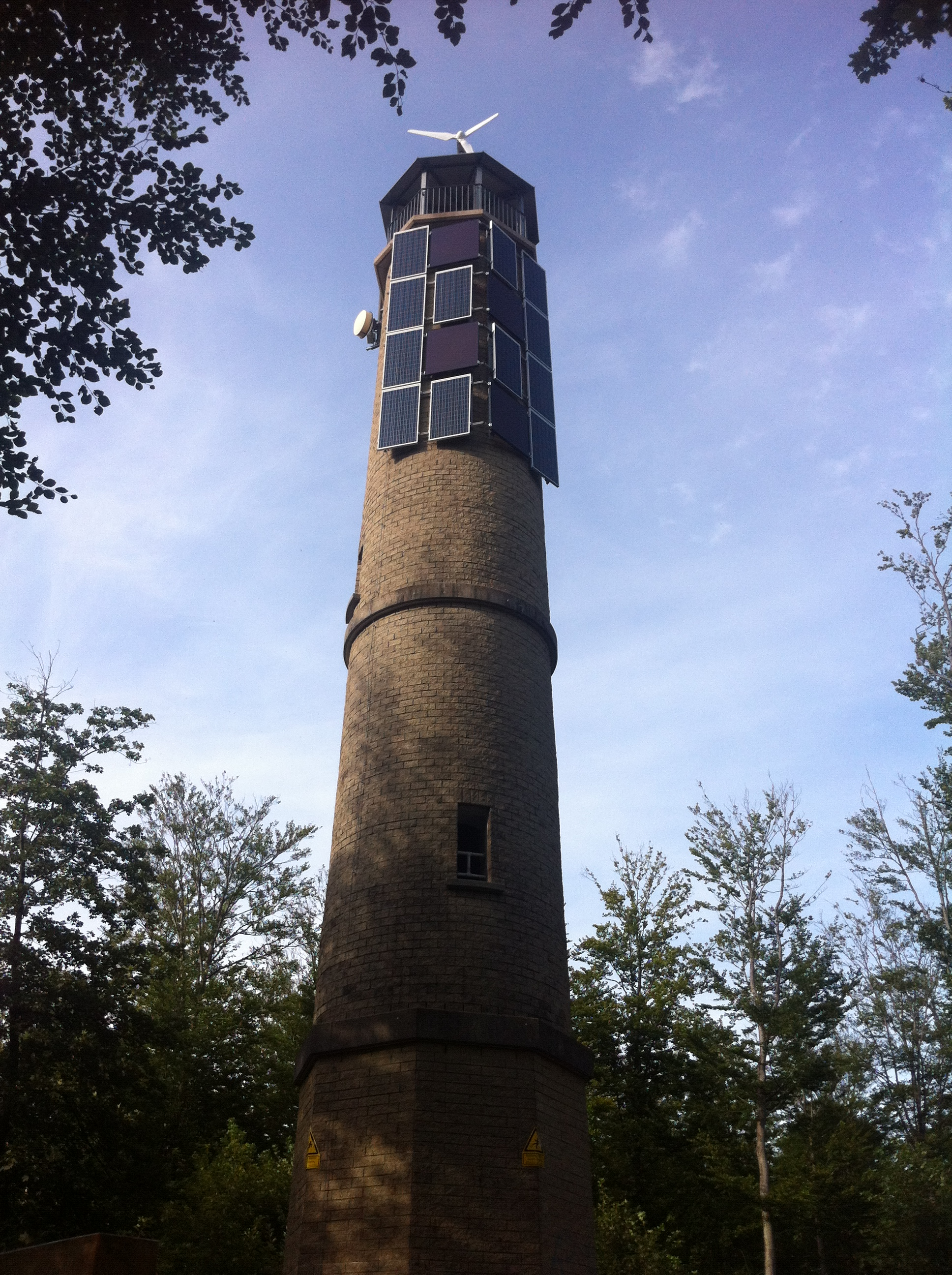

Highest point
- Elevation: 686 m above sea level (NHN) (2,251 ft)
- Coordinates: 48°28′N 8°02′E

Geography
- Location within Baden-Württemberg
- Location: Baden-Württemberg, Germany (Brandeckturm (AT))
- Parent range: Central Black Forest

The Brandeckkopf is 686.1 m above sea level (NHN), and the highest mountain in the borough of Offenburg.

At 686.1 metres above sea level, the Brandeckkopf is the highest mountain of Offenburg. It is located within the Zell-Weierbach district. The Brandeckturm, an observation tower, stands at the summit. The mountain is said to have been given its name by the Celts, who brought burnt offerings here. The mountain lies within the 1897 hectare Brandeck landscape protection area.
