= Hirschbach Falls =

Coordinates: 48.035003°N 8.092538°E

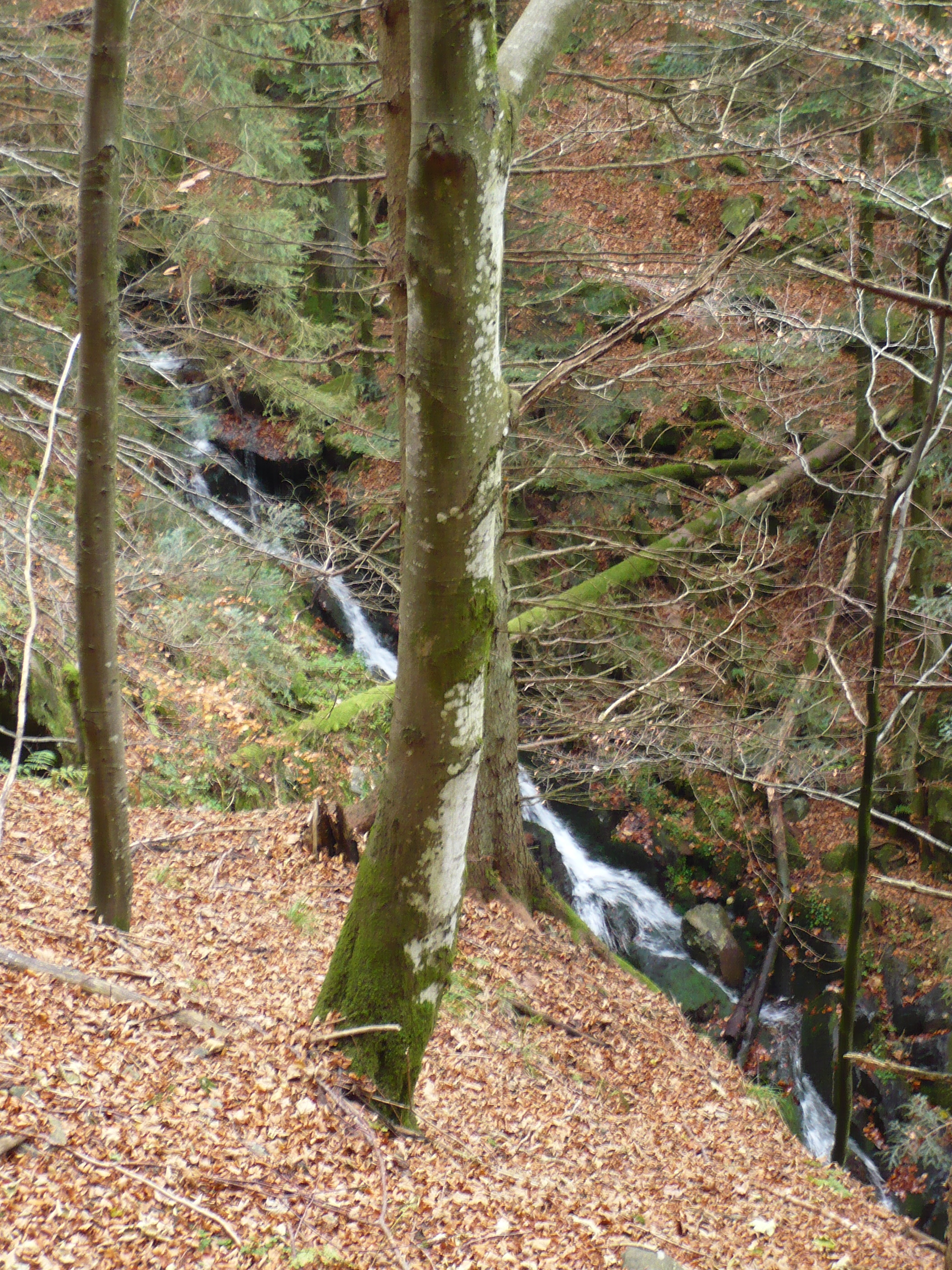
Hirschbach Falls

The Hirschbach Falls (German: Hirschbachfälle) lie between St. Peter and Simonswald in that part of the High Black Forest, which is also considered part of the Central Black Forest. The main cascade, which is just under 20 metres high, falls into the Hirschbach stream in an ice age cirque in the valley of Simonswälder Tal, where it empties into the Zweribach, a tributary of the Wild Gutach. Another smaller waterfall lies 300 metres upstream.

== General ==
The Black Forest is well known for its numerous waterfalls. The reason for that is its high relief energy which is characterised by large changes in height over short distances which, is the topographical situation in the Simonswälder Tal. On the western side of the valley which drops 300–700 metres, the heavy ice age glaciation has given rise to cirque walls. The Hirschbach and Zweribach streams which initially flow through gently rolling highlands descend steeply into these cirques, which are over 300 metres, in a series of cascades, of which only the Zweribach Waterfalls are nationally well known.

The upper Hirschbach Fall drops over a small valley step formed by glacial activity in the high valley of the Gschwandersdobel on the southwestern corner of the protected Bannwald forest and nature reserve of Zweribach at a height of about 905 metres. It has a drop of just under five metres. The lower Hirschbach Fall, the main cascade, lies at a height of about 850 metres and drops just under 20 metres in four steps into the rugged cirque of Groß-Kar.

The Hirschbach Falls are only accessible on foot, either from the Simonswald village of Wildgutach or from the plateau of the Platte.

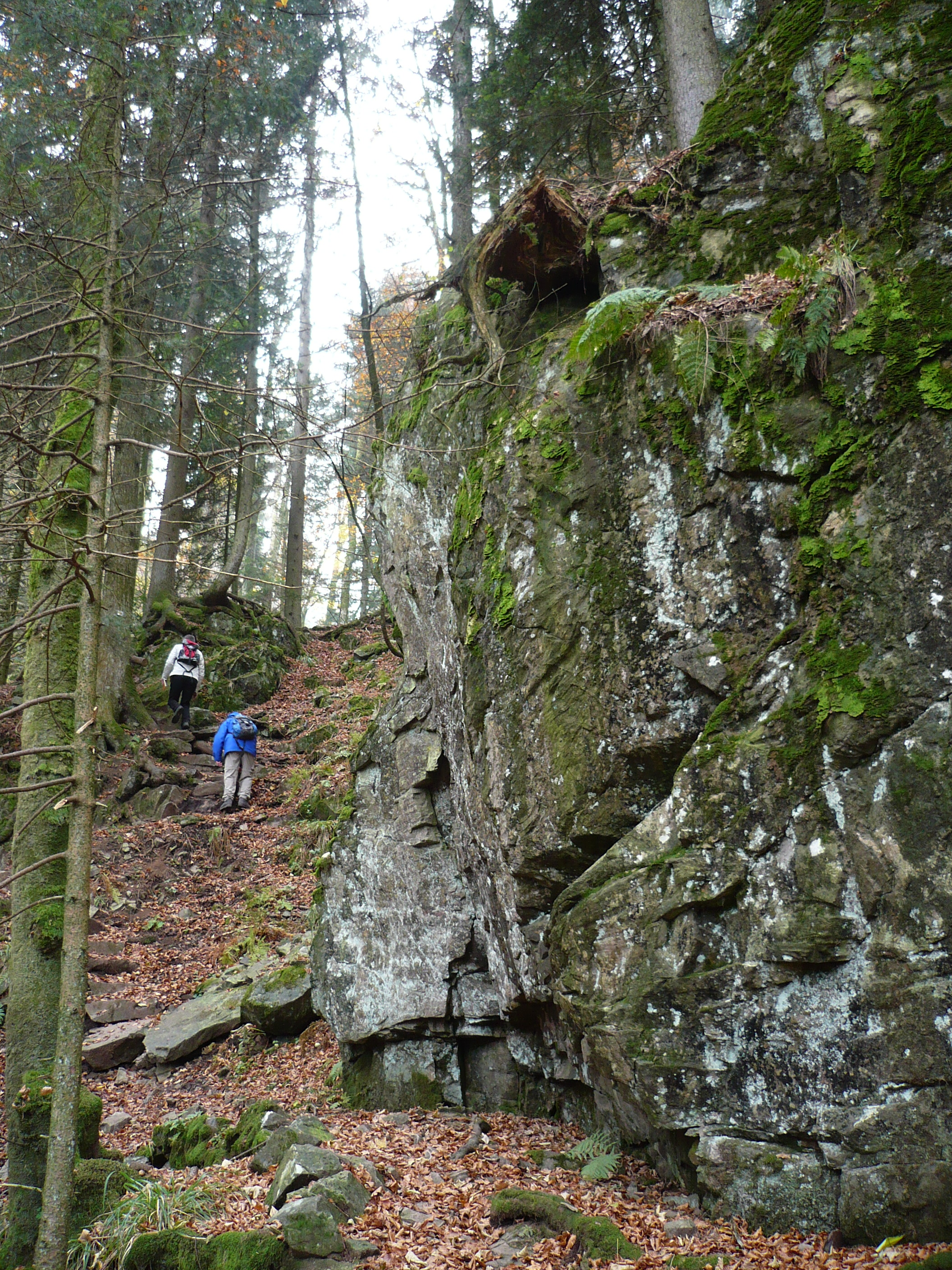
Rock path between the Hirschbach Fall and the Zweribach Waterfalls

== Tourism ==
The lower Hirschbach Fall is the goal of numerous walks from the Simonswälder valley, the Hexenloch Mill or from St. Märgen, usually as part of a hike to the nearby Zweribach Waterfalls. Direct access is via the car park at the Zweribach Bridge / Hirschwinkelweg. From there, the waterfalls are well signposted: first the path runs steadily uphill, turns right after a left turn, heads past the Bruggerhof farm to the former farmstead of the burnt out Brunnenhof, of which the remains of the wall and chapel have survived. At this point, there is a campsite with a refuge hut. Above a fork in the path, keep to the left (the right branch leads to the Zweribach Waterfalls). The route then follows a narrow rock path, an overgrown scree slope and steps and walkways secured with ropes and railings, before reaching the waterfalls after walking for 600 metres steadily through the Bannwald forest. The marked trail then leads uphill in serpentines to a wide forest path between St. Märgen and Platte. The path continues, sometimes diverging to the right, and accompanying the Hirschbach valley on its orographically right-hand side to reach the upper fall.

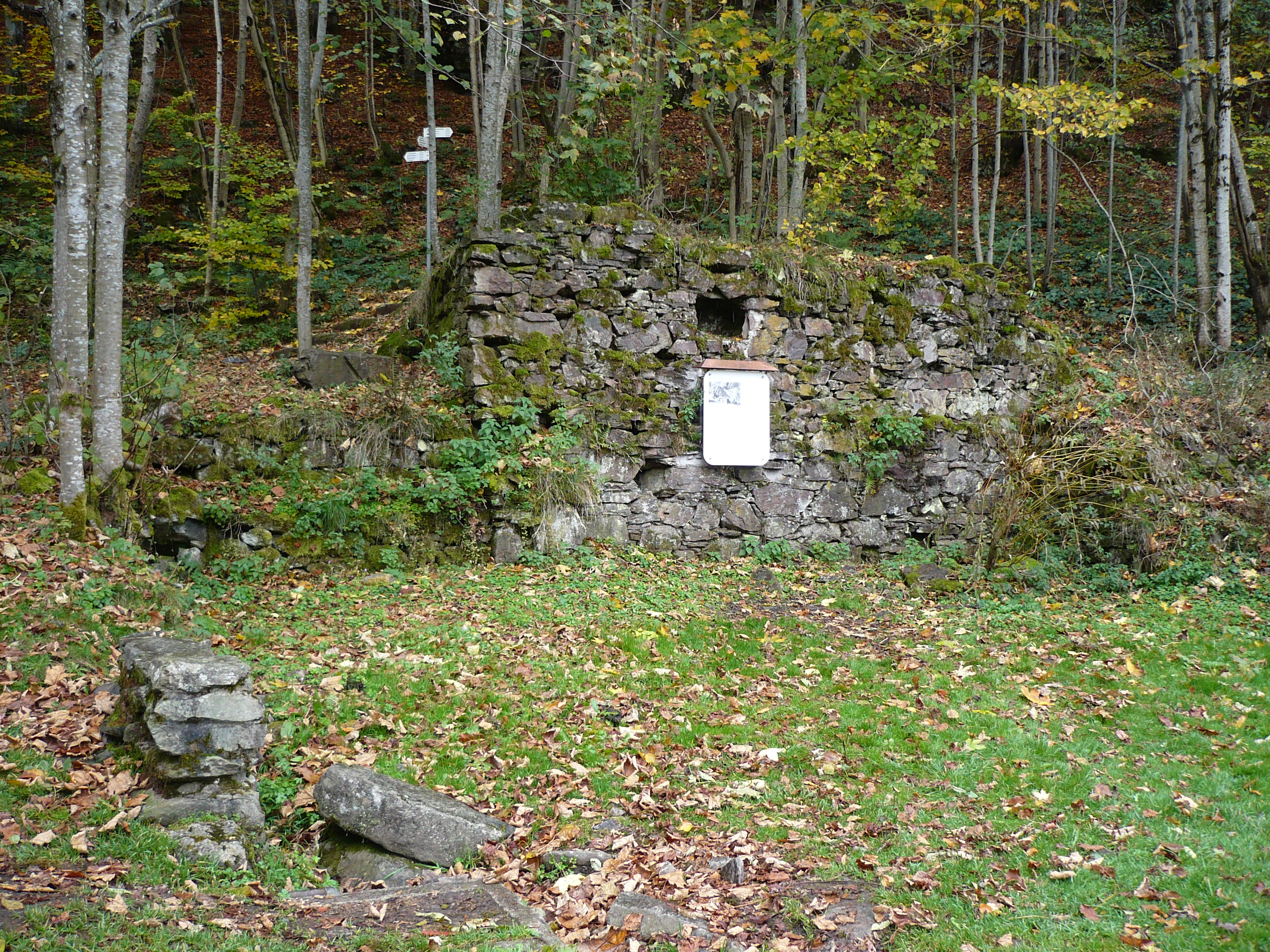
Remains of the Brunnenhof below the Hirschbach Falls

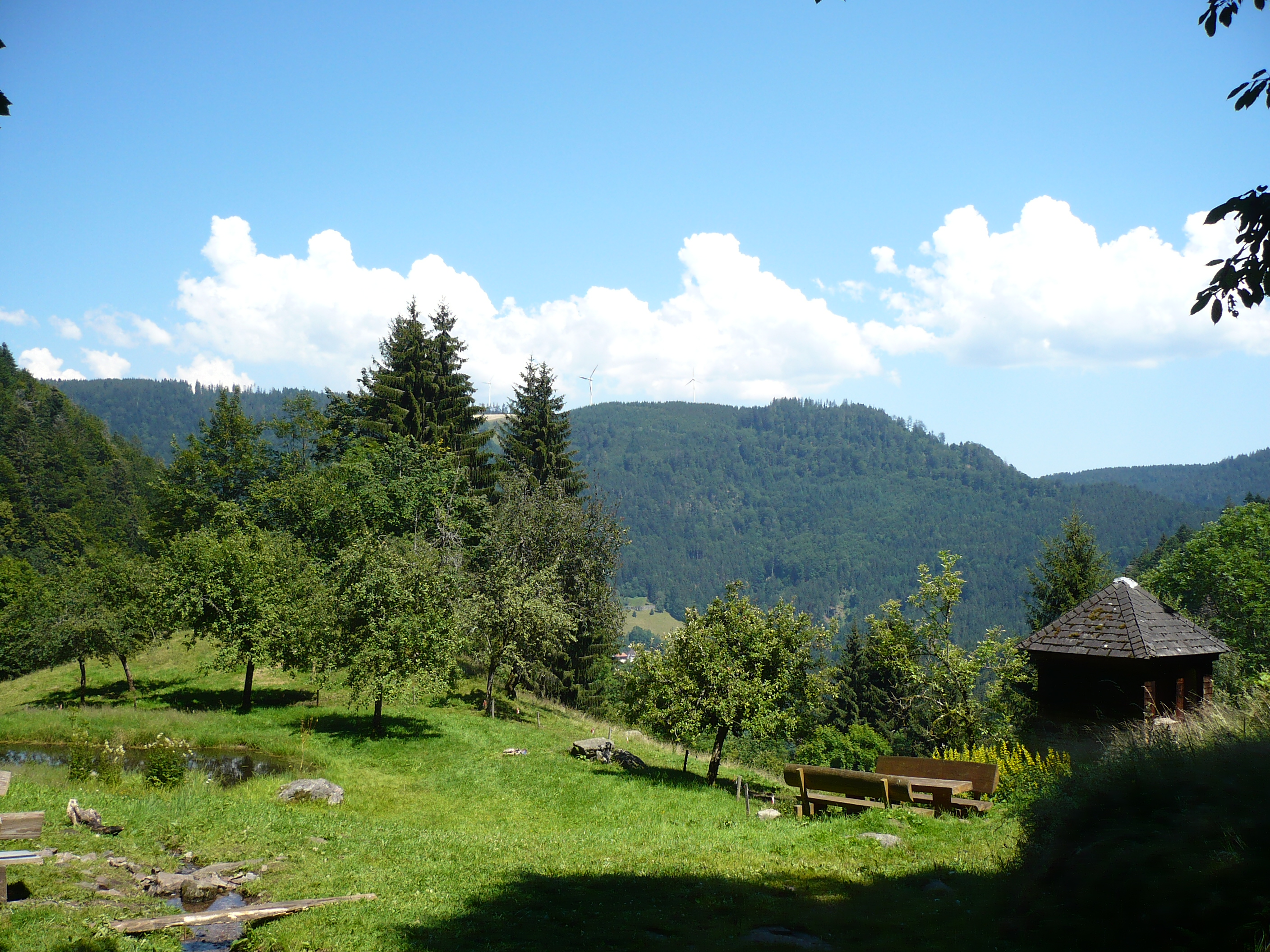
Vesperplatz and chapel below the Hirschbach Falls

== See also ==
- Teichschlucht (2 kilometres east, on the other side of the Simonswälder valley)
