= Obereck =

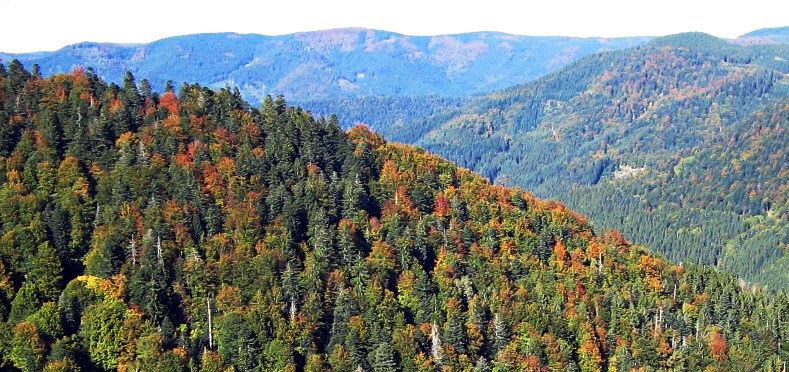
- View of the Obereck over the valley of the Wild Gutach

Highest point
- Elevation: 1,177 m (3,862 ft)
- Prominence: 199 m (653 ft)
- Parent peak: Weißtannenhöhe (line parent)
- Isolation: 8.16 km (5.07 mi) to Sattelhöhe
- Coordinates: 48°06′50″N 08°07′01″E

Geography
- Location within Baden-Württemberg
- Location: Baden-Württemberg, Germany

Geology
- Rock type: Gneiss

At 1,176.6 m above sea level (NHN) the Obereck is the third highest mountain of the Central Black Forest after the Kandel and the Weißtannenhöhe. The three mountains also lie within the area designated as the High Black Forest.

== Location ==
The Obereck lies in the east of the municipality of Simonswald above the village of Hintergriesbach. Its rounded summit or kuppe lies on a ridge that is especially sharp in the area of the Schultiskopf, and which runs away from the main chain between the Rohrhardsberg and Brend descending westwards into the valley of the Wild Gutach (Simonswälder Tal) some 700 metres lower down. It is bounded by the valleys of the tributary streams, the Griesbach to the south and the Haslachsimonswälder Bach to the north (Kostgfäll Gorge).

== Geology ==
Like most other mountains of the Central Black Forest, the Obereck is made from gneisses. The original bunter sandstone platform was eroded away during the course of the ice ages. Traces of ice age glaciation, especially cirque-like landforms and moraines, are clearly visible on the northern slopes.

== Vegetation ==
The original mixed forest stands have been largely replaced by spruce as a result of intensive forestry.

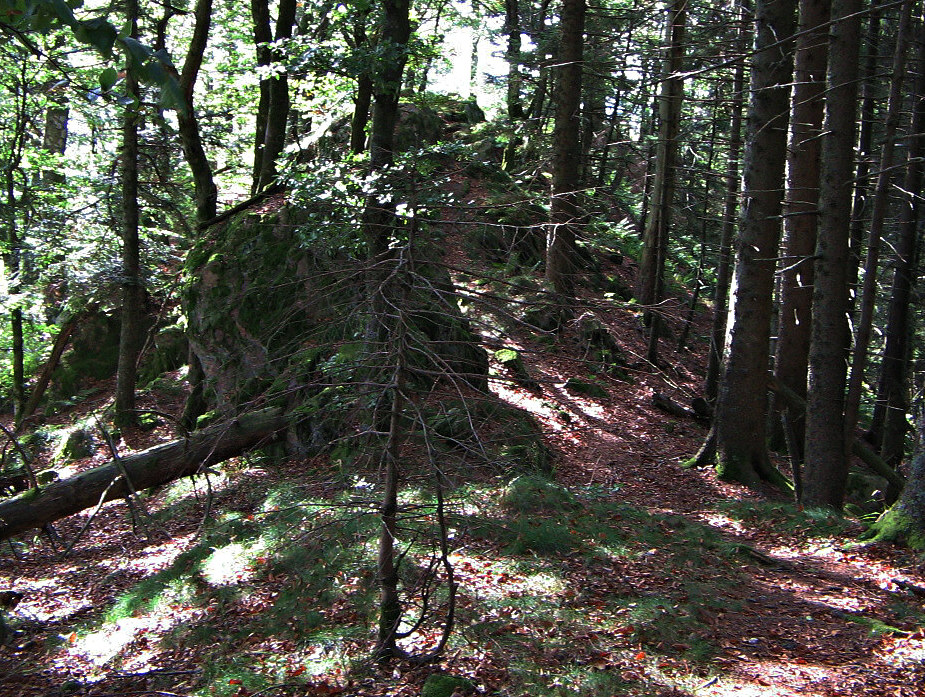
Ridgeway southwest of the Obereck

== Tourism ==
The Obereck is accessible on several trails, especially through the rocky, demanding climb up the arete, but is not easily linked with the nearby Kostgfäll Gorge. It is not very well known. Its heavy forestation means that the summit does not have good views and neither are there good facilities for skiers (a few pistes but no lifts). There is accommodation in the surrounding villages within Simonswald.
