= Schultiskopf =

Mountain in Germany

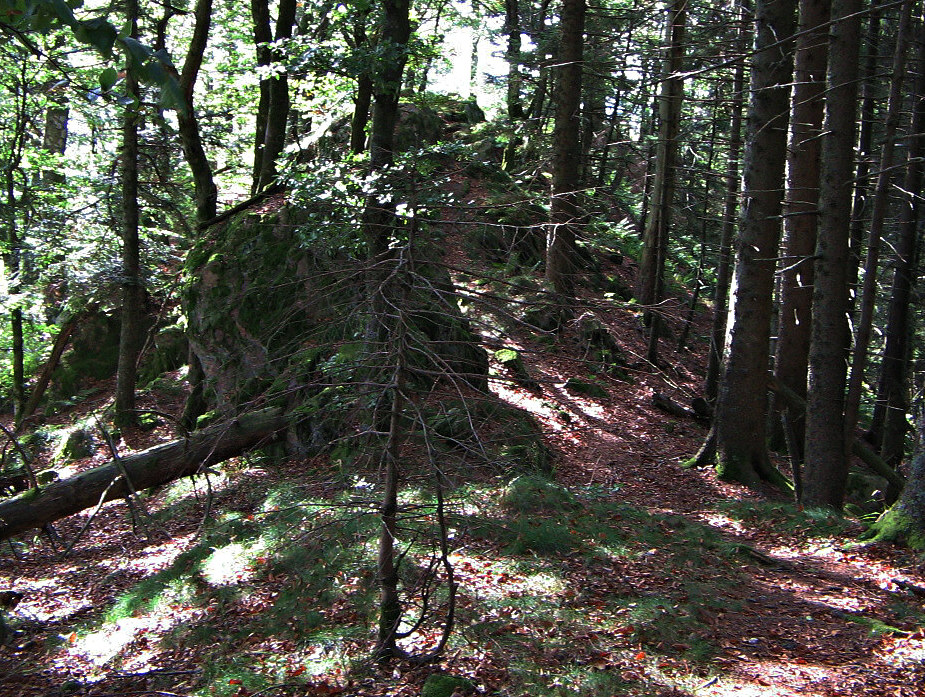
- Path along the summit ridge

Highest point
- Elevation: 1,076.6 m above sea level (NHN) (3,532 ft)
- Prominence: 36.9 m
- Isolation: 0.49 km → Ibichkopf
- Coordinates: 48°06′32″N 8°05′40″E

Geography
- Location within Baden-Württemberg
- Location: Baden-Württemberg, Germany
- Parent range: Black Forest

The Schultiskopf lies in the highest part of the Central Black Forest and, at 1,076.6 m above sea level (NHN), is a ridge-like subpeak of the Obereck (1,176.6 m above sea level (NHN)).

== Description ==
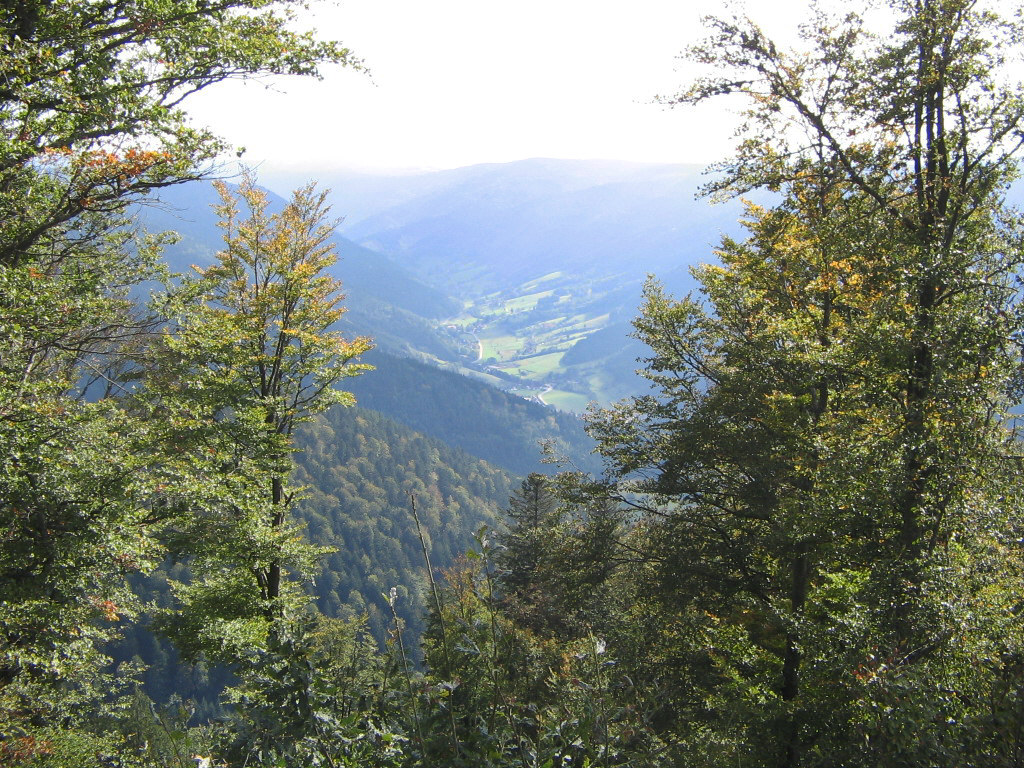
View into the valley of the Wilde Gutach

The Schultiskopf, together with its western neighbour, the Höllkopf (921.8 m above sea level (NHN)) forms a 2.5-kilometre-long rocky ridge whose steep northern slopes drop up to 550 metres into the valley of the Haslachsimonswälder Bach and whose southern side descends 400 metres into the Ibichbach valley. A footpath runs along the ridge, having climbed from Altsimonswald in the valley of the Wilde Gutach (360 m above sea level (NHN)), and via the Obereck to the Farnberg Plateau between Rohrhardsberg and Brend. From the Höllkopf the Kostgfäll Ravine to the north, which runs parallel to the path, may be reached on unmarked forest tracks and linking footpaths.

The summit is marked with a cast iron cross and offers views over the Simonswälder Tal to Kandel and, in clear weather, to the Feldberg. The view is partly obscured by trees.
