= Hörnleberg =

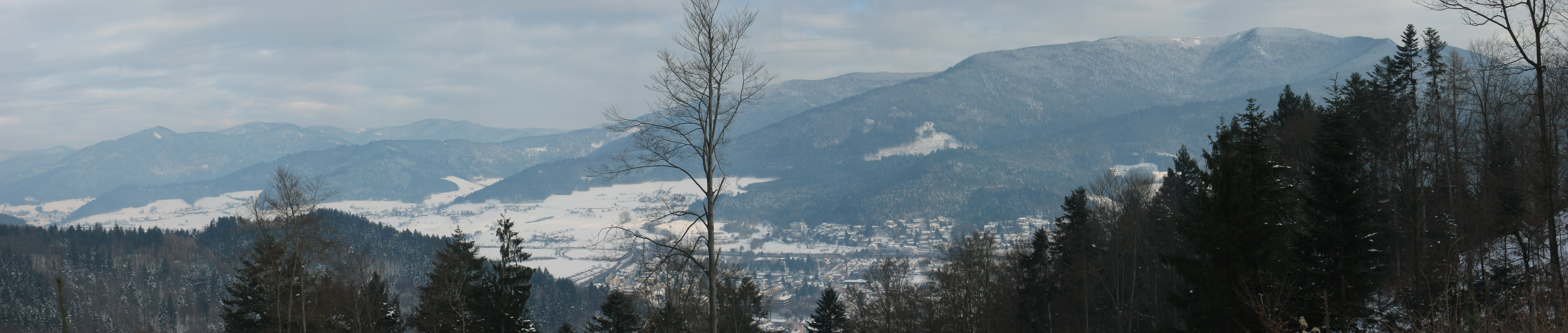
- The Hörnleberg (far left), the Elz valley (centre) and the Kandel

Highest point
- Elevation: 906 m above sea level (NHN) (2,972 ft)
- Coordinates: 48°08′N 8°03′E

Geography
- Location within Baden-Württemberg
- Location: Baden-Württemberg, Germany
- Parent range: Central Black Forest

Geology
- Mountain type(s): Low mountain, pyramidal peak (pilgrimage chapel)
- Rock type: paragneisses

The Hörnleberg is a mountain, 905.6 m above sea level (NHN), in the Central Black Forest in southern Germany. Its summit pyramid rises around 600 metres above the apex formed by the valleys of the Elz and the Wild Gutach. Currently (2012, after forestry work) it has a view of the Elz valley and the Upper Rhine Plain.

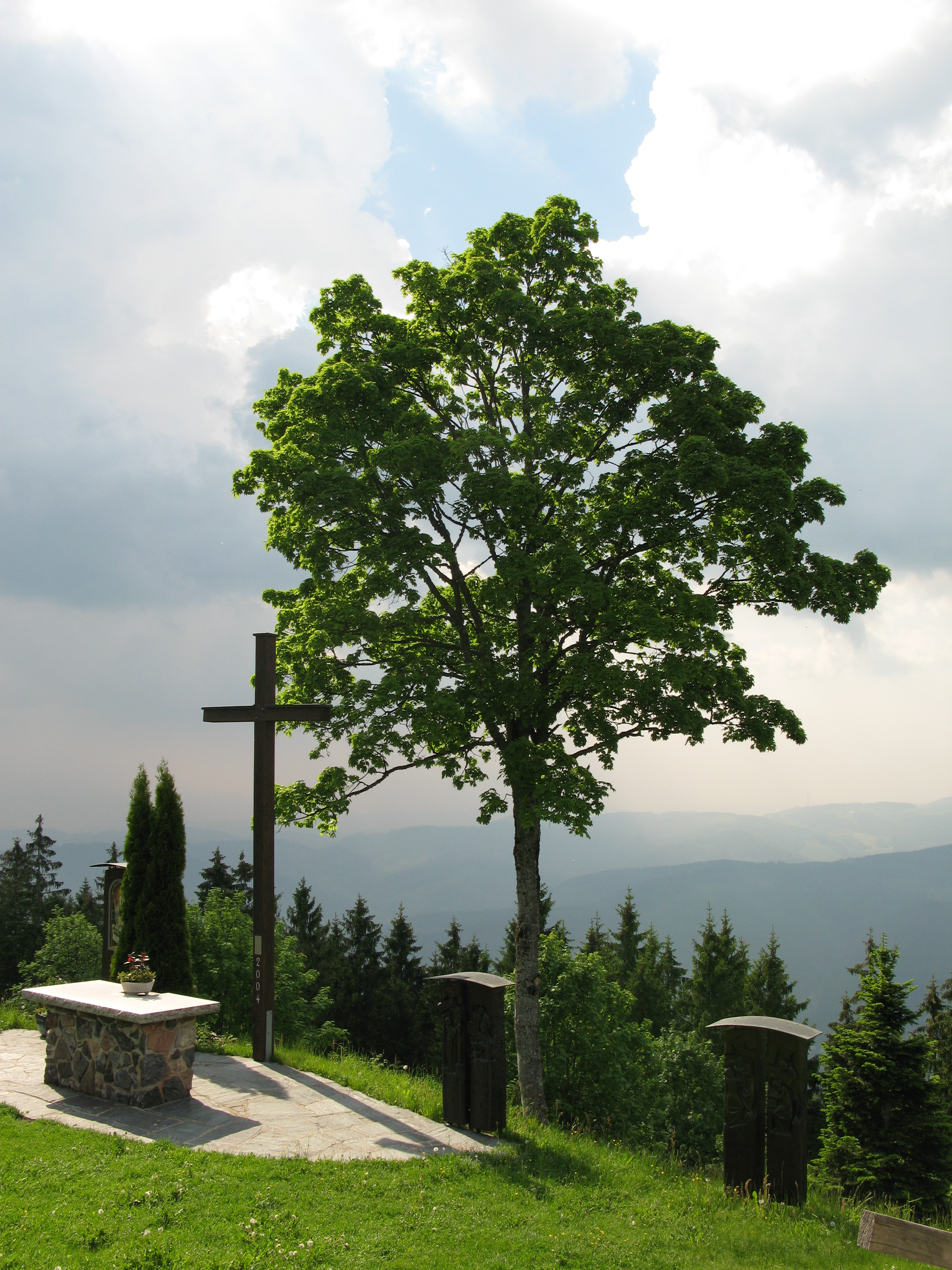
Altar at the summit

At the summit is the pilgrimage chapel of Our Dear Lady (Unsere Liebe Frau), which was presumably built in the 8th or 9th century. The first record of the capella uf dem Hörnlin dates to the year 1469, in a prebendary occupancy book of the Diocese of Konstanz. According to legend, a blind man from the Alsace swore that if God gave him back his sight, he would build a chapel in honour of Mary on the first mountain that he saw.

Two Stations of the Cross, from Bleibach and from Oberwinden, lead up to the chapel.
