= Gutach =

Gutach may refer to:

- towns in Baden-Württemberg, Germany:
  - Gutach im Breisgau, in the district of Emmendingen
  - Gutach (Schwarzwaldbahn), in the Ortenau district
- rivers in southern Black Forest, Germany:
  - Gutach (Kinzig), in the Ortenau district, running through Gutach (Schwarzwaldbahn)
  - Gutach (Elz) or Wilde Gutach, running into the Elz (Rhine) at Gutach im Breisgau
  - Gutach, one of the rivers whose confluence forms the Wutach
