= Josef Frühmesser =

German painter

Josef Frühmesser (1929–1995) born in Gutach in the Black Forest was a German painter who studied at the Kunstschule Düsseldorf and later worked in Augsburg. He mainly dealt with landscape paintings of the South German Prealpes.
