= Wild Gutach =

River in Germany

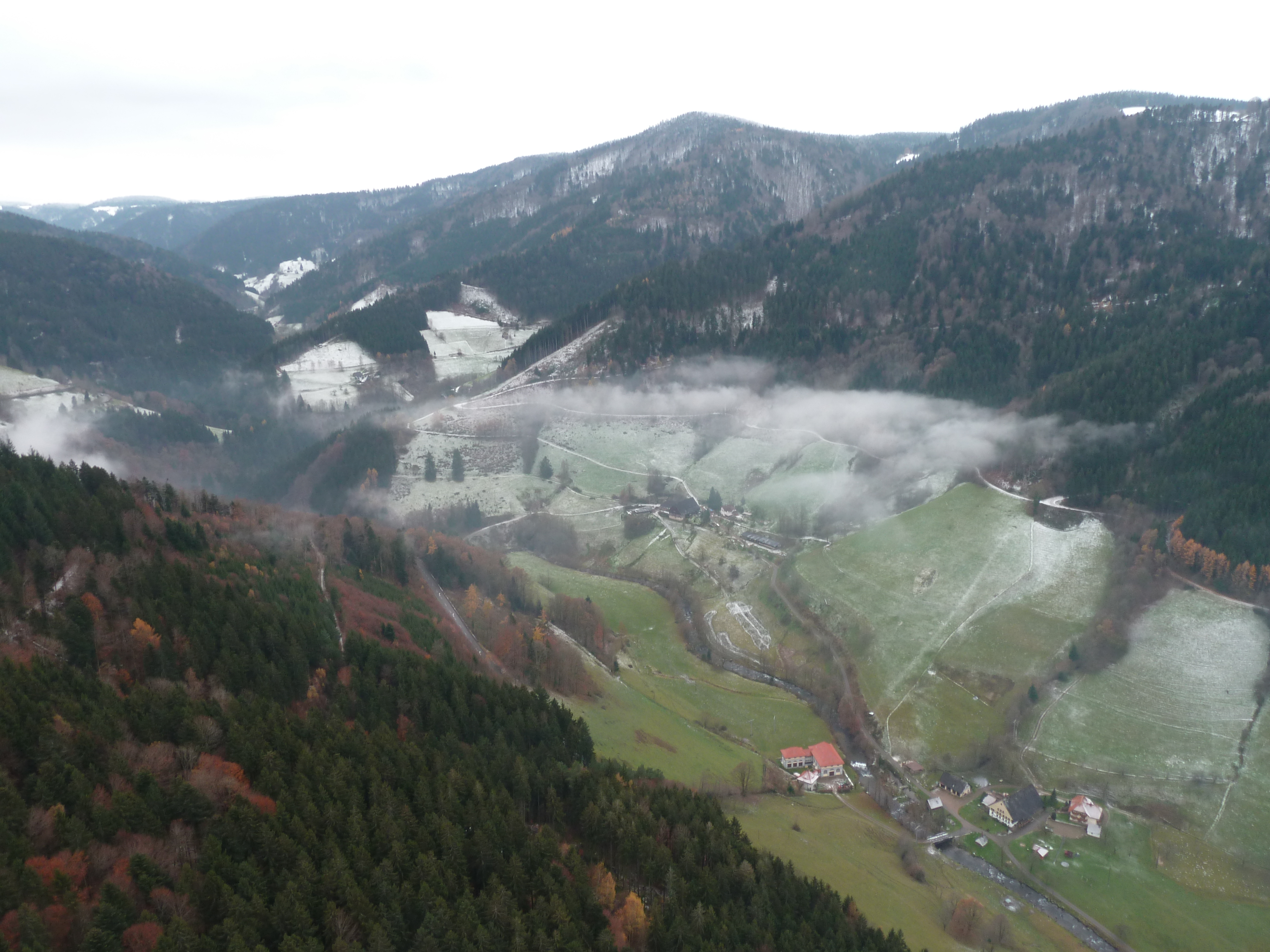
- The Wild Gutach on exiting the narrow valley of Wildgutach into the broader Simonswälder Tal (front)

Location
- Country: Germany
- State: Baden-Württemberg
- Location: Black Forest
- Reference no.: DE: 23384

Physical characteristics
- Source
  - location: near Furtwangen (as the Heubach)
  - elevation: 1,065 m above sea level (NN)
- Mouth
  - location: near Gutach im Breisgau into the Elz
  - coordinates: 48°07′14″N 7°59′23″E
  - elevation: 284 m above sea level (NN)
- Length: 25.2 km (15.7 mi)
- Basin size: 129 km^{2} (50 sq mi)

Basin features
- Progression: Elz→ Rhine→ North Sea
- Landmarks: Small towns: Furtwangen, St. Märgen, Gütenbach, Simonswald and Gutach im Breisgau
- Population: c. 6600
- Tributaries
  - left: Glaserbach, Zweribach, Ettersbach
  - right: Bregenbach, Teichbach, Kilpenbach, Nonnenbach, Griesbach, Haslachsimonswälder Bach

The Wild Gutach (German: Wilde Gutach) is a river in Baden-Württemberg, Germany. It flows into the Elz in Gutach im Breisgau.

== Sights and structures ==
- Hexenlochmühle with two overshot water wheels in a ravine-like witch's hole (Hexenloch)
- Balzer Herrgott, a stone statue of Christ which has almost grown into a tree
- Teichschlucht ravine below Gütenbach
- Hirschbach Falls and Zweribach Waterfalls in the rugged Zweribach Cirque (Bannwald and nature reserve)
- Plattensee Reservoir in the high valley of the Platte of the Zweribach
- Zweribachwerk, power station above Simonswald
- Brend summit
- Kandel summit
- Schultiskopf and Spitzer Stein (rocky arêtes)
- Kostgfällschlucht with waterfalls and the Gfällfelsen rock formation (climbing area, nature reserve)
- Chapel on the Hörnleberg

== See also ==
- List of rivers of Baden-Württemberg
