= Glaswaldsee =

Lake in Baden-Württemberg, Germany

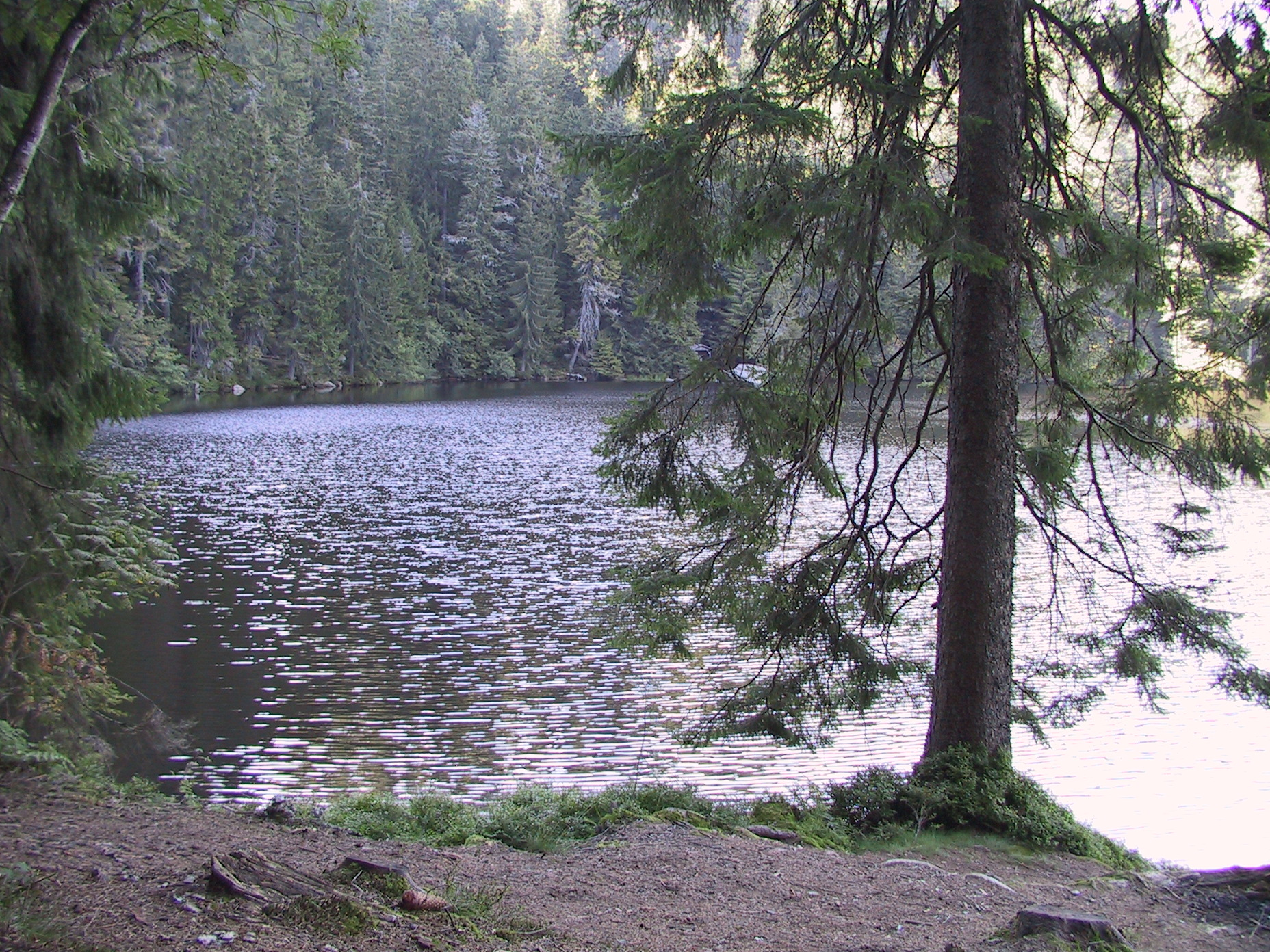
- The Glaswaldsee near Bad Rippoldsau-Schapbach

- Location within Baden-Württemberg
- Location: Baden-Württemberg
- Coordinates: 48.42583°N 08.26194°E
- Primary inflows: Seebach
- Primary outflows: Seebach
- Max. length: 0.220 km (0.137 mi)
- Max. width: 0.170 km (0.106 mi)
- Surface area: 2.9695 ha (7.338 acres)
- Max. depth: 11 m (36 ft)
- Shore length^{1}: 0.650 km (0.404 mi)
- Surface elevation: 839.0 m (2,752.6 ft)
- ^{1} Shore length is not a well-defined measure.

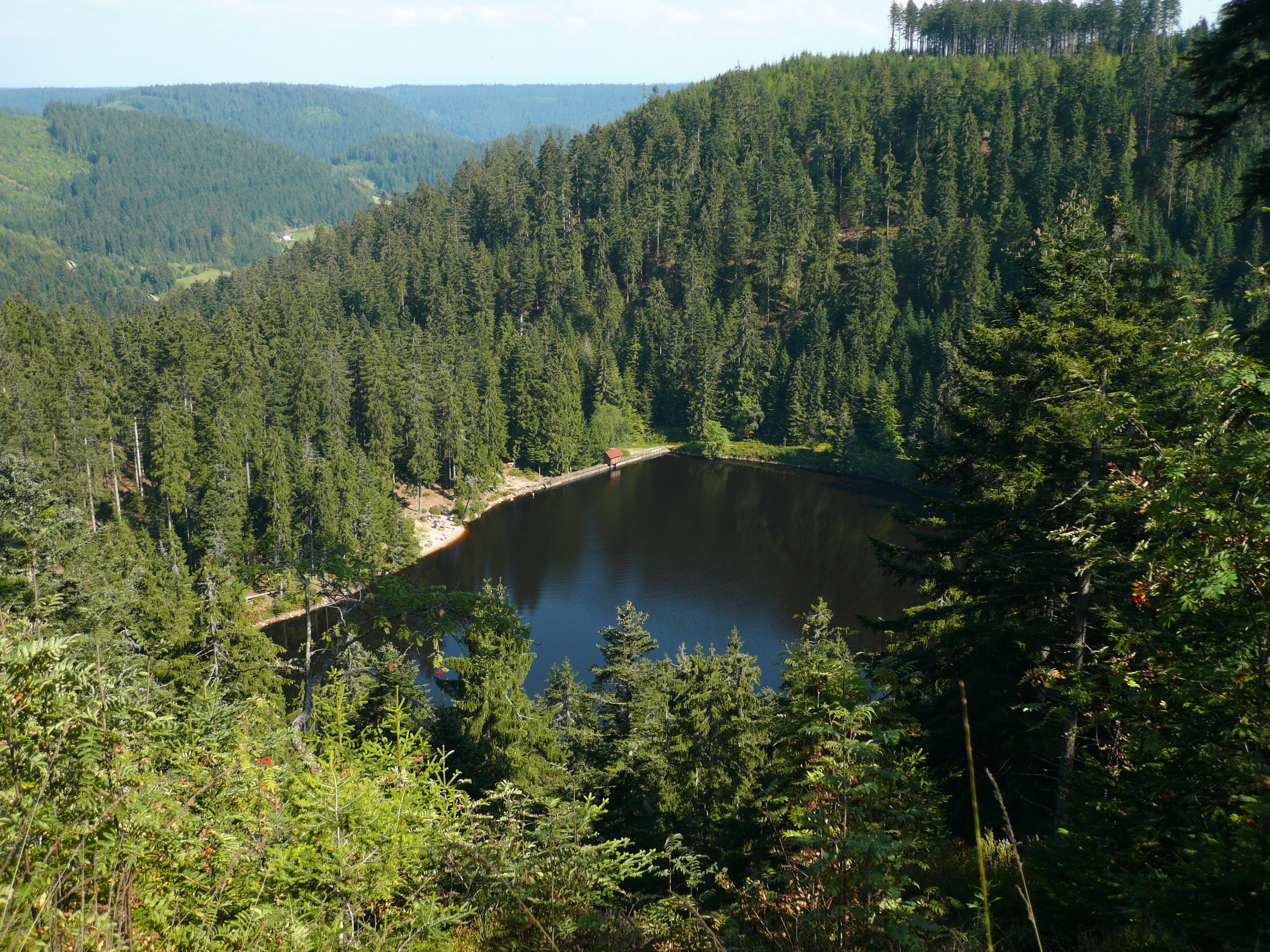
The Glaswaldsee seen from the Lettstädter Höhe

The Glaswaldsee near the spa town of Bad Rippoldsau-Schapbach in the Central Black Forest in Germany lies in a cirque that is sunk into the steep eastern mountainside of the Lettstädter Höhe. It is part of the nature reserve of the same name that was established in 1960.

The tarn formed in a cirque that was carved from the bunter sandstone rock out by a glacier during the ice age. Steep banks surround the lake which is up to 11 metres deep and has an area of about 3 hectares. Its diameter varies between 170 and 220 metres. The Glaswaldsee is fed by underground water sources; its surface catchment area, apart from an artificial diversion from the uppermost reaches of the Seebach, only covers about an area of 190 hectares.

In centuries gone by, the lake was known as the Wilder See ("Wild Lake") (like the Wildsee at Ruhestein and the Wildsee near Kaltenbronn), but its present name is derived from the former manufacture of glass bottles in the neighbouring villages. Today the surface of the Glaswaldsee is raised by a sandstone wall which used to enable the transportation of timber down river as part of the timber rafting industry in the valley of the Wolf.

The Glaswaldsee is one of the first lakes of the Black Forest to be trigonometrically surveyed and mapped. In 1655 Landgrave Frederick Rudolph of Fürstenberg-Stühlingen directed the Basle priest, Jakob Mentzinger, to prepare a map of his sovereign territory in the Kinzig valley. To illustrate his approach to the national survey, Mentzinger recorded in the lower part of his map an enlarged view of the Glaswaldsee with the calculations made by him.

== See also ==
- List of lakes of Germany
