= High Black Forest =

Region in Baden-Württemberg, Germany

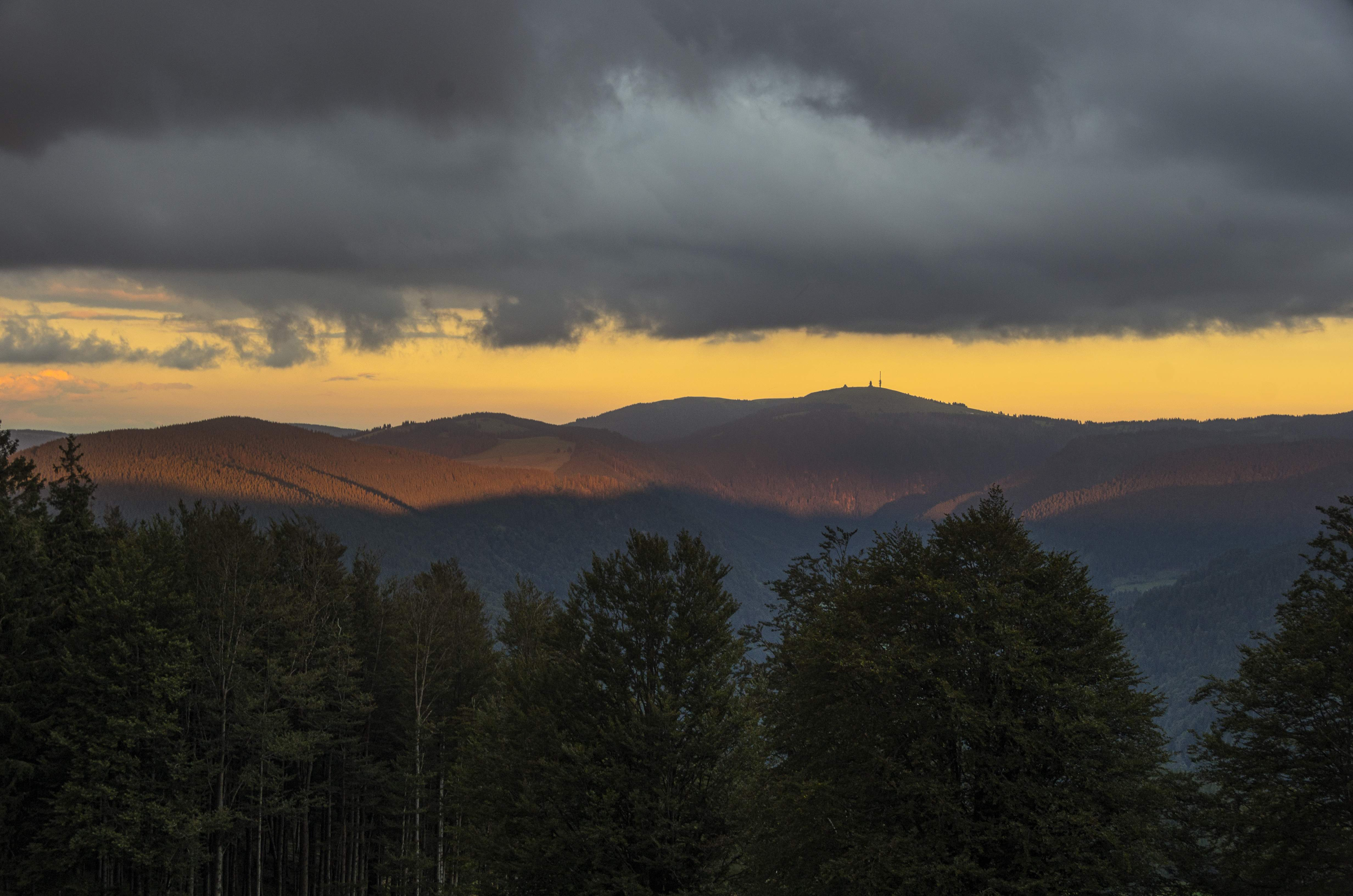
The Feldberg massif at dusk

The High Black Forest (German: Hochschwarzwald) is a touristic and geographical region in the south-west of the German federal state Baden-Württemberg, primarily in the Southern Black Forest.

== History of the name ==
The term Hochschwarzwald originally became well known thanks to tourism. Winter sports and climatic spa resorts in the highlands of the Black Forest used it in advertising even before the First World War. Since the 1920s the term also found its way into literature about the region, albeit with variations in terms of its actual boundaries.

Whilst some authors used the term just to describe the area around the Feldberg massif, others equated it to the whole of the Southern Black Forest and still others used it to refer to the highest part of the Central Black Forest southeast of the Elz valley (regions around the Kandel and the highlands of St. Peter and St. Märgen), sometimes as far as the Hünersedel north of the Elz.

Even the highland areas of the Northern Black Forest around the Hornisgrinde and the Kniebis have used the term in tourist advertising. In addition, official Baden and Württemberg geology publications of the 1930s described the higher regions of the Northern Black Forest as the Hochschwarzwald in contrast with the sunken blocks on its perimeter along the fault lines and the tectonically less uplifted Central Black Forest.

In its 1955 edition, the Handbook of Natural Region Divisions of Germany divides the Black Forest into six major units, the southwesternmost being designated as No. 155 Hochschwarzwald with an area of 1271.2 km². In addition to the southern centre of uplifted terrain of the Black Forest that peaks in the Feldberg it also includes the deeply incised valleys that radiate away to the south and west as well as the Weitenau Foothills (Weitenauer Vorberge).

On the renaming of the old county of Neustadt/Schwarzwald to Hochschwarzwald (1956–1973) and the present county of Breisgau-Hochschwarzwald the term was also adopted by administrative units.

One of the fact files of the Bundesamt für Naturschutz also uses the name: number 15500 Hochschwarzwald (Südlicher Schwarzwald) with an area of 1550 km². It covers those areas of the Black Forest roughly south of a line from Freiburg to Neustadt.

In the natural region fact files issued by the state of Baden-Württemberg the Hochschwarzwald (No. 155) extends northwards as far as the Elz and covers an area of 1990 km².

== Literature ==
- Roland Weis, Harald Riesterer: Der Hochschwarzwald. Von der Eiszeit bis heute. Thorbecke Verlag, Ostfildern 2009, ISBN 978-3-7995-0840-7.

== See also ==
- Breisgau-High Black Forest
