= Hanhart =

Watch company

- Type: Private
- Industry: Watchmaking
- Founded: 1882 in Diessenhofen, Switzerland
- Founder: Johann A. Hanhart
- Headquarters: Diessenhofen, Switzerland (registered office); Gütenbach, Germany (manufacturing)
- Key people: Felix Wallner, Simon Hall (co-CEOs)
- Products: Chronographs, wristwatches, stopwatches
- Website: www.hanhart.com

Hanhart is a Swiss-German watch company that was established by Johann A. Hanhart in Diessenhofen (TG), Switzerland, in 1882. Today, it makes Bicompax chronographs, other styles of wristwatch, and stopwatches.

== History ==
On 1 July 1882, the Swiss watchmaker Johann A. Hanhart opened a watch shop in Diessenhofen, in north-eastern Switzerland. In 1902, he relocated his business to Schwenningen, southern Germany. In 1924, Hanhart launched his first stopwatch, and a short time later, the product range was extended to include pocket watches and wristwatches. From 1932 onwards, following the death of his father, Wilhelm Julius Hanhart concentrated on manufacturing raw movements. In 1938, the first single-button chronograph with the "Calibre 40" entered series production, pilot’s chronographs following in 1939.

=== Second World War ===
By 1939, Hanhart employed around 200 people and had begun supplying pilot's chronographs to the German military. The single-pusher Calibre 40 of 1938 was joined in 1939 by the two-pusher flyback Calibre 41 and the TachyTele model, which were issued mainly to the Luftwaffe during the Second World War. Hanhart states that it treats this period of its history, which fell under National Socialism, as a subject of ongoing reflection, and documents it at its museum in Gütenbach.

=== Postwar era and the 417 ===
In 1954, Hanhart introduced the 417 and the stainless-steel 417 ES (from the German Edelstahl), a flyback pilot's chronograph built for the newly formed West German Bundeswehr according to criteria of robustness, reliability and readability. The 39 mm watch had a continuously rotating fluted bezel with a red marker and a bicompax dial with counters at three and nine o'clock. Hanhart supplied the chronograph to the German armed forces for about ten years, until it refocused on stopwatch production in 1963. Produced only in small numbers and never sold to civilians, surviving examples of the original 417 have become sought-after collectors' items. The American actor Steve McQueen owned a 417 ES, which he wore as a personal watch rather than under any endorsement and which appeared on screen in the 1962 film The War Lover.

=== Present Day ===
Today, Hanhart produces its instrument watches and stopwatches in its workshops in Gütenbach, southern Germany. The registered offices of the brand are in Diessenhofen, Switzerland. Its current mechanical range includes the Pioneer line, based on historic designs, the more contemporary Primus collection, the Aquasphere dive watches, and continued reissues of the 417 ES, which has become the brand's best-known modern model.

== Red pusher ==
A distinctive feature of many Hanhart chronographs is a red pusher. On flyback chronographs the coloured pusher served as a safety measure intended to keep pilots from accidentally resetting an elapsed time. A popular legend attributes the colour instead to a pilot's partner who painted the pusher with red nail polish so that he would think of her and return safely; the practical explanation is the documented one. The red pusher has become a visual signature of the brand and is now produced from a hybrid ceramic material.
