= Faller =

German toy company

Faller.

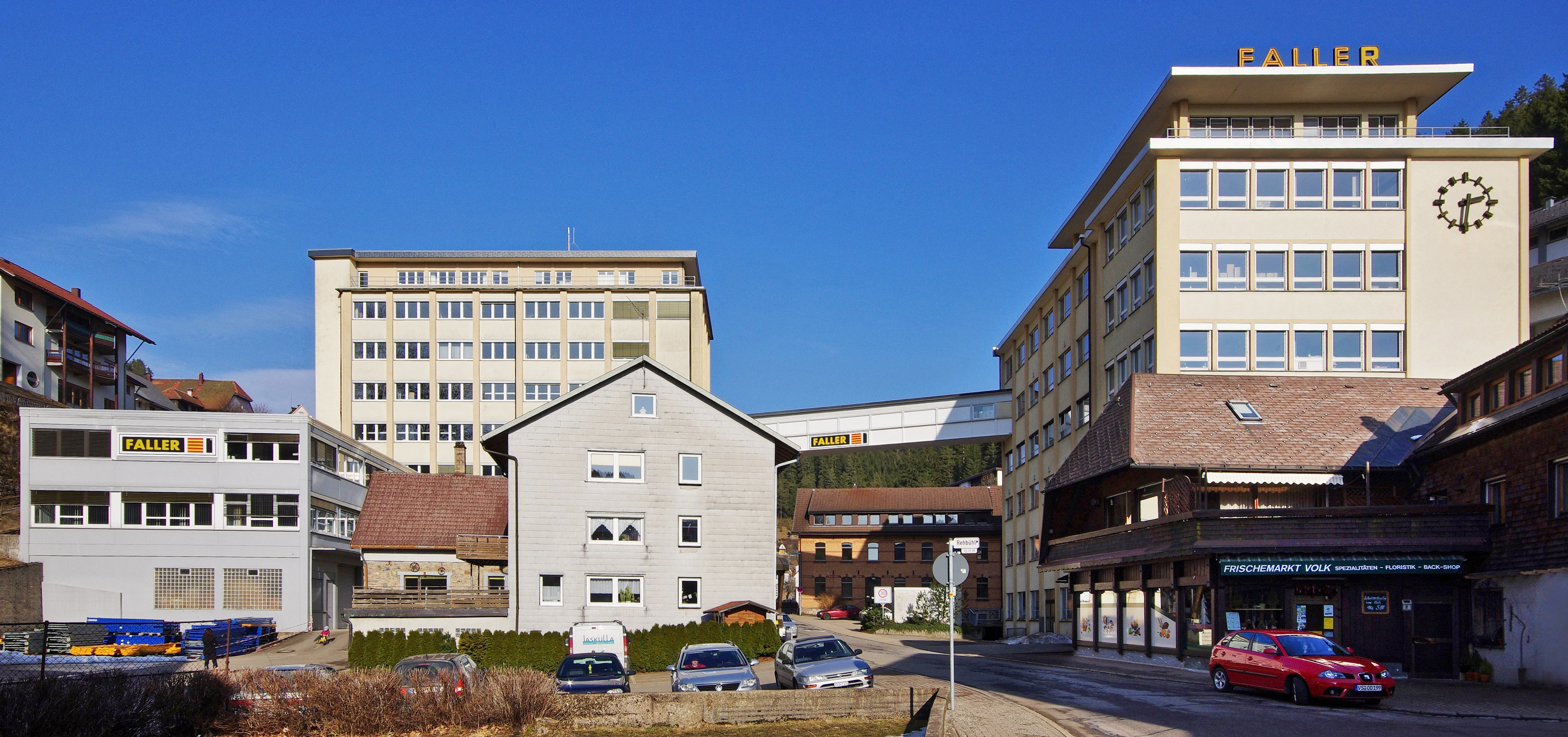
- Industry: Hobby
- Founded: 1946
- Founder: Edwin Faller and Hermann Faller
- Headquarters: Gütenbach, Germany
- Area served: Worldwide
- Website: faller.de

Faller (stylised in all caps) is a German toy company founded in Stuttgart in 1946 by brothers Edwin and Hermann Faller. The company later relocated to the brothers' home town of Gütenbach in the Black Forest.

Faller now specializes in making scenery, plastic model kits and other accessories for model railroads but has manufactured a range of toys during its history, such as model airplane kits, the 'Auto Motor Sport' (AMS) slot car racing sets and die-cast model cars. Their modern product line includes railway structures, houses and commercial buildings, bridges, amusement rides and terrain accessories in H0, N, TT and Z scales, as well as the Faller Car System (FCS). Since 1997 Faller also owns the Pola brand, which is now solely devoted to G scale structures.

== Faller Car System ==
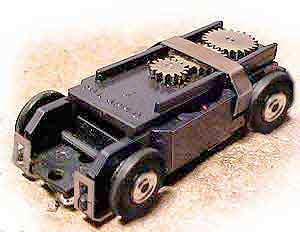
A Faller/Aurora T-jet chassis.

From the 1960s into the 80s, Faller produced the Auto Motor Sport (AMS) slot cars, based on existing patents, similar to the Aurora Model Motoring system. The Faller controller and the car had a small selenium rectifier on board so two cars could run independently on the same track on the positive or negative half wave AC. The cars were in 1:65 scale but could be used with the 1:87 H0 scale model railways.

H0 scale autos with Faller Car System.

Faller has a "Car System" (FCS) in both the H0 and N scale, which consists of battery-powered road vehicles, made by other manufacturers such as Wiking, that have a magnet attached to the front steering. The magnet follows a steel wire hidden under the road surface, resulting in trucks and buses that behave in a realistic fashion without the need for guide rails or a slot in the road. This system is extensively used by the Miniatur Wunderland ('miniature wonderland') model railway attraction in Hamburg, Germany.

Mechanisms are also available to stop vehicles and to switch them from one route to another, as at an intersection. These can be integrated with sensors and working traffic lights to create a realistic operating scene.

In September 2013, Faller released their Digital Car System allowing computer control of the system.

== Amusement park fairground models ==
Faller has produced amusement park fairground models for over 20 years, with well over a hundred different models. Many have been discontinued as newer models have been introduced. Faller offers models in H0 scale and a limited number of amusement park fairground models in N scale as well.
