= Rohrhardsberg =

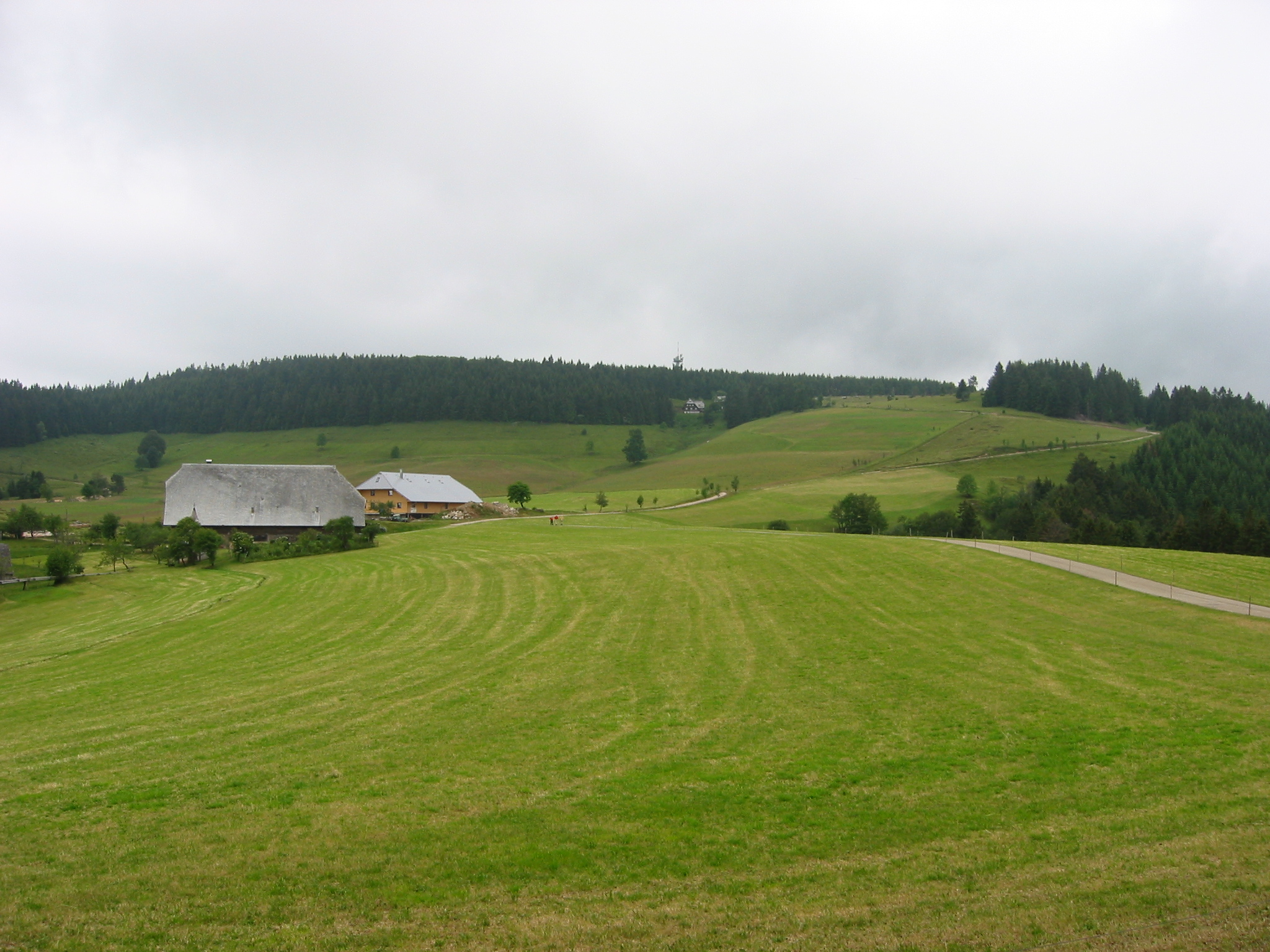
- Picture of the summit

Highest point
- Elevation: 1,152 m (3,780 ft)
- Coordinates: 48°7′47″N 08°7′41″E

Geography
- Location within Baden-Württemberg
- Location: Baden-Württemberg, Germany

The Rohrhardsberg is a mountain in the Central Black Forest in southern Germany. At 1,152.1 metres (3,780 ft) above sea level, it is the northernmost summit of the elongated, north–south oriented Farnberg Plateau that has several high points over 1,150 metres. The mountain is situated near Elzach in the state of Baden-Württemberg.

== Location ==
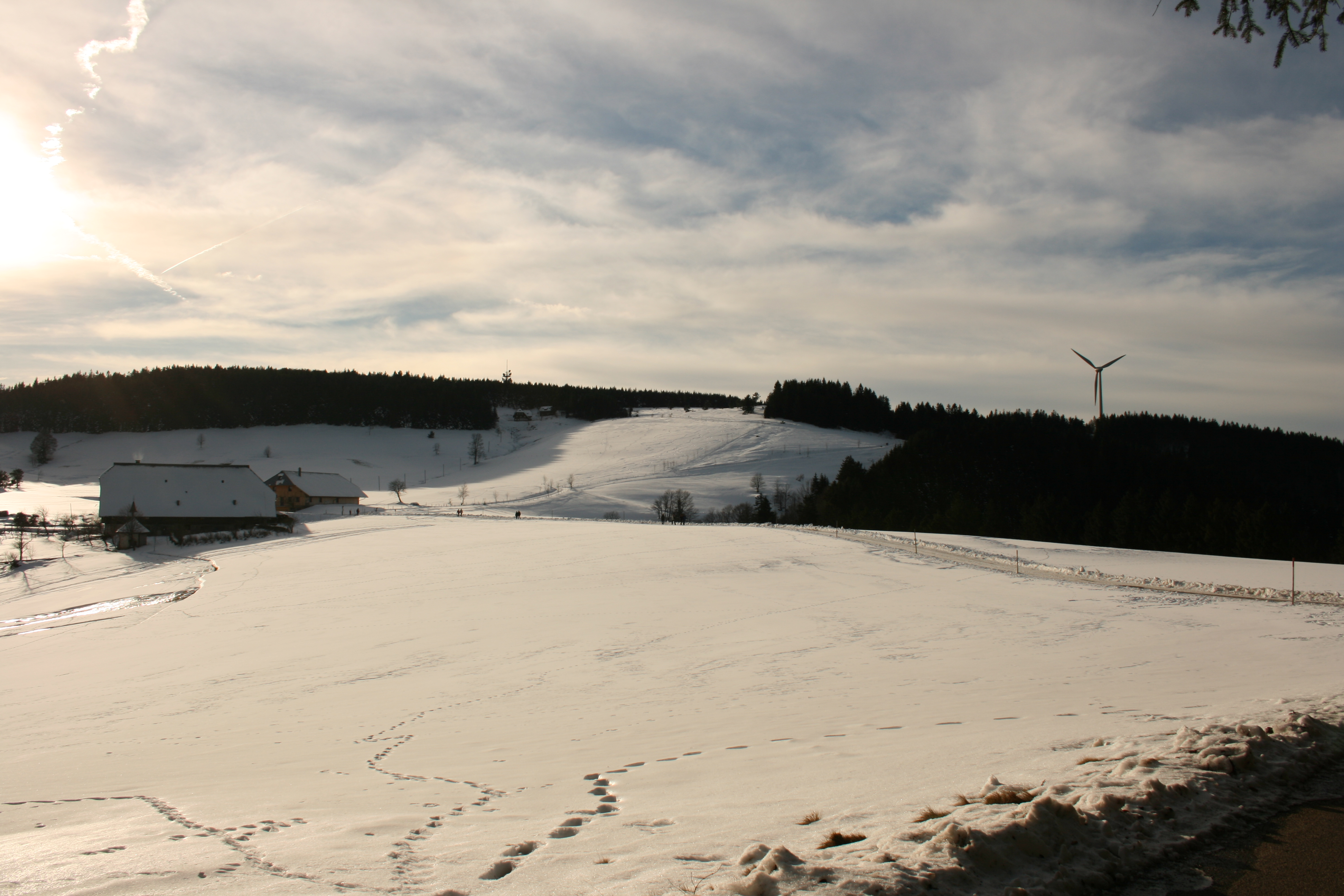
The summit in winter

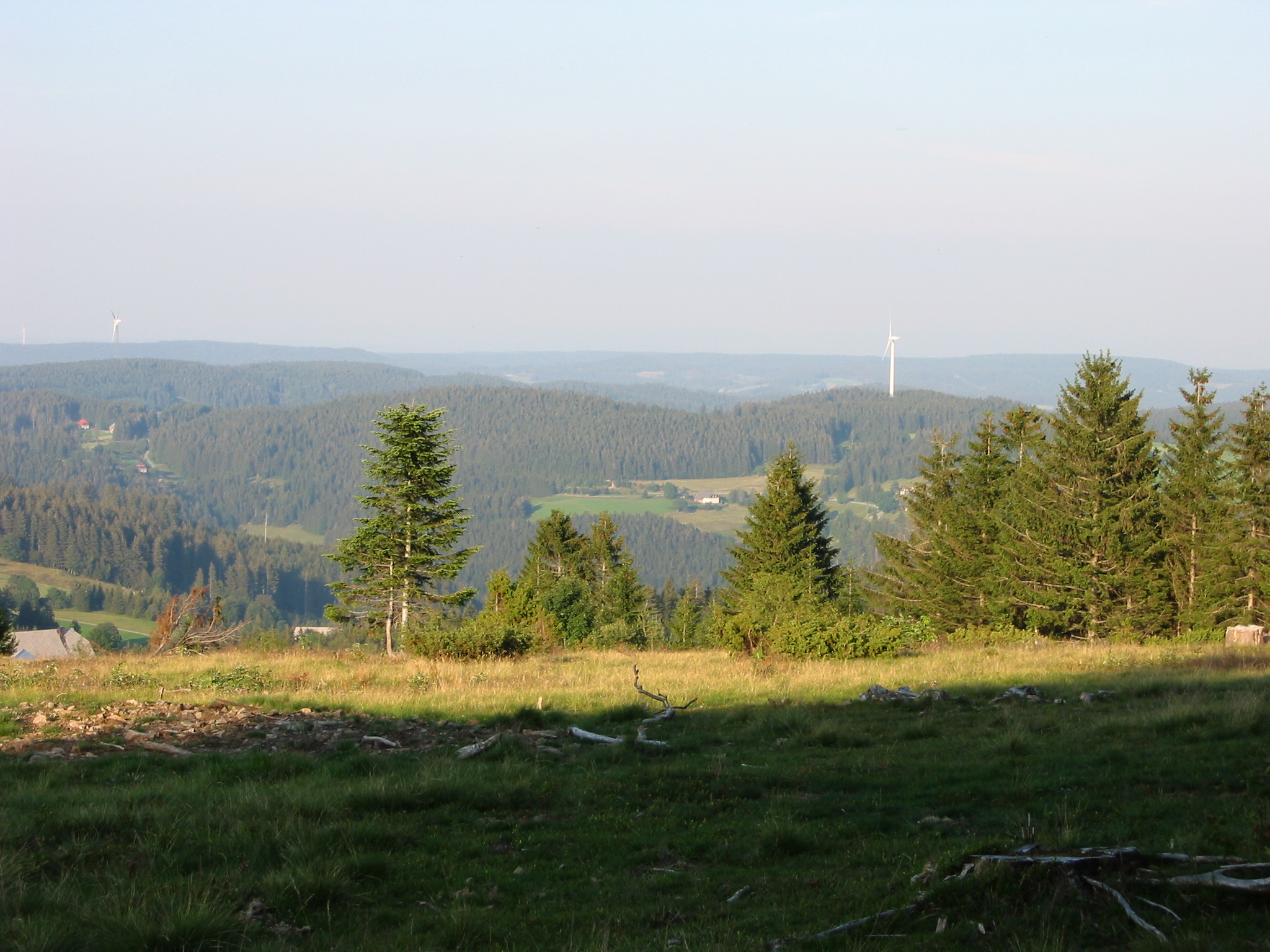
View from the summit

The Farnberg Plateau, which includes the Rohrhardsberg lies in the triangle between the valleys of the Elz, Oberprechtal and Simonswäldertal. Its highest summits are the Griesbacher Eck,(1,172 m above NHN) which rises south of the Rohrhardsberg, and, further to the southwest, the Obereck (1,177 m above NHN). The boundary between the counties of Emmendingen, in the west, and Schwarzwald-Baar-Kreis, in the east, runs over the summit crest. Its highest point is the east top of theGriesbacher Eck at (1,164 m above NHN).

== Nature reserve ==
In the comparatively less incised region to the west which is characterised by large differences in height there are several nature reserves: the Rohrhardsberg-Upper Elz reserves and the two neighbouring reserves to the west, Yacher Zinken and Kostgefäll. The entire region is designated as a Natura 2000 area. On the ridge of the plateau between the Schwedenschanze on the Rohrhardsberg and the Brend are habitats for the capercaillie and hazel grouse and other, in some cases very rare, animal and plant species. For this reason it was agreed that in the Rohrhardsberg model project, only a narrow axis between the Brend and the Schwedenschanze would be used for sporting and tourist purposes and large areas would be left largely undisturbed. Several other areas would continue to be extensively grazed, because a purely mechanistic approach of leaving the few remaining rough pastures to grow wild would make no sense either for economic or for ecological reasons. This project is a successful cooperation between conservation agencies, the forestry commission, municipalities and various user groups.

In 2007, in the Rohrhardsberg area one of the first Natura 2000 management plans by the Regierungspräsidium Freiburg was completed. Further funding from Natura 2000 has been spent in the area since 2006 from the EU LIFE programme to ensure the Natura 2000 network. In cooperation with local farmers, inter alia, a further opportunity for naturalising or reforesting grazing land has been carried out.

== Leisure ==
In winter the Farnberg ridge between the Rohrhardsberg and Brend is a popular ski area; in summer the many trails managed by the Black Forest Club, such as the Zweitälersteig, enable extensive walking tours through the region.

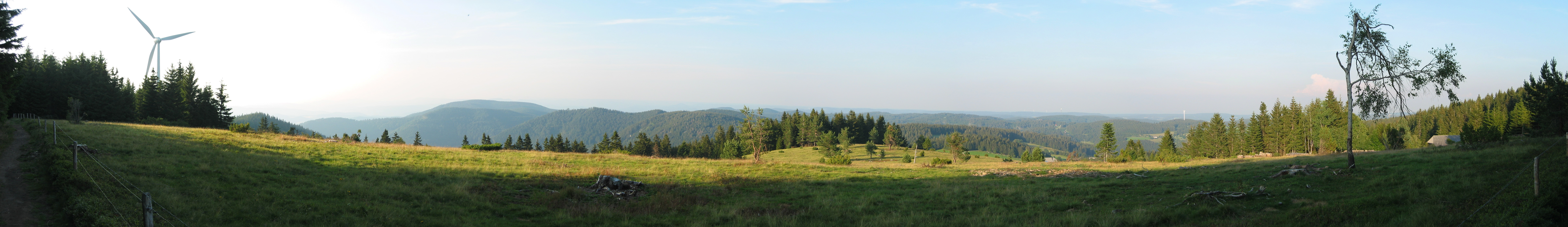
Panoramic view from the Rohrhardsberg

== Infrastructure ==
On the domed summit of the Rohrhardsberg is a roughly 30-metre-high transmission tower belonging to Deutsche Telekom and, since 2004, a wind turbine.
