= Gütenbach =

- Municipality
- Coat of arms

- Location of Gütenbach within Schwarzwald-Baar-Kreis district
- Interactive map of Gütenbach
- Location within Germany Location within Baden-Württemberg
- Coordinates: 48°02′41″N 08°08′21″E
- Country: Germany
- State: Baden-Württemberg
- Admin. region: Freiburg
- District: Schwarzwald-Baar-Kreis
- First mentioned: 1360 AD

Government
  - Mayor (2017–25): Lisa Hengstler

Area
  - Total: 18.49 km^{2} (7.14 sq mi)
- Elevation: 826 m (2,710 ft)

Population (2025-12-31)
  - Total: 1,018
  - Density: 55.06/km^{2} (142.6/sq mi)
- Time zone: UTC+01:00 (CET)
  - Summer (DST): UTC+02:00 (CEST)
- Postal codes: 78148
- Dialling codes: 07723
- Vehicle registration: VS
- Website: www.guetenbach.de

Gütenbach (German pronunciation: [ˈɡyːtn̩bax]) is a municipality in the district of Schwarzwald-Baar in Baden-Württemberg in Germany. It is the home of the Faller toy company.

== History ==
Gütenbach, originally called Wuotenbach, was first mentioned in an official certificate in the year 1360 AD, hence, it was founded during the Late Middle Ages. Between the 15th and 16th centuries, the name was changed to Wüttembach. At the beginning of the 17th century the town was subject to the Authority of Triberg, which was part of Further Austria. In 1806, Gütenbach joined the new-founded Grand Duchy of Baden.

== Geography ==
Gütenbach is located in the middle of the Black Forest, about 7 km west of Furtwangen. The city is in the drainage basin of the Rhine river and close to the drainage divide of the Danube and the Rhine. The Teichbach stream starts at the confluence of Vordertalbach and Hintertalbach creeks, and flows through the town. After passing the Teichschlucht canyon, Teichbach flows into the Wilde Gutach, at the so-called Pfaffmühle.

The town lies in an altitude between 530 m and 1,120 m. Over 62% of the territory is covered with forest, which is a cause of Podzolization of the soil.

=== Neighbour towns ===
- East: Furtwangen
- South: St. Märgen
- North and West: Simonswald

== Economy ==
Gütenbach's farmers used to produce clocks during the winter at their home. Later, the town developed a well-established clock-industry. Nowadays, the clock industry is represented by the manufacturer Hanhart, which also makes watches and stopwatches. Furthermore, in the 20th century, the toy company Faller settled in Gütenbach. The town's largest employer is the special purpose machinery manufacture Rena.
