= Brend (mountain) =

Mountain in Germany

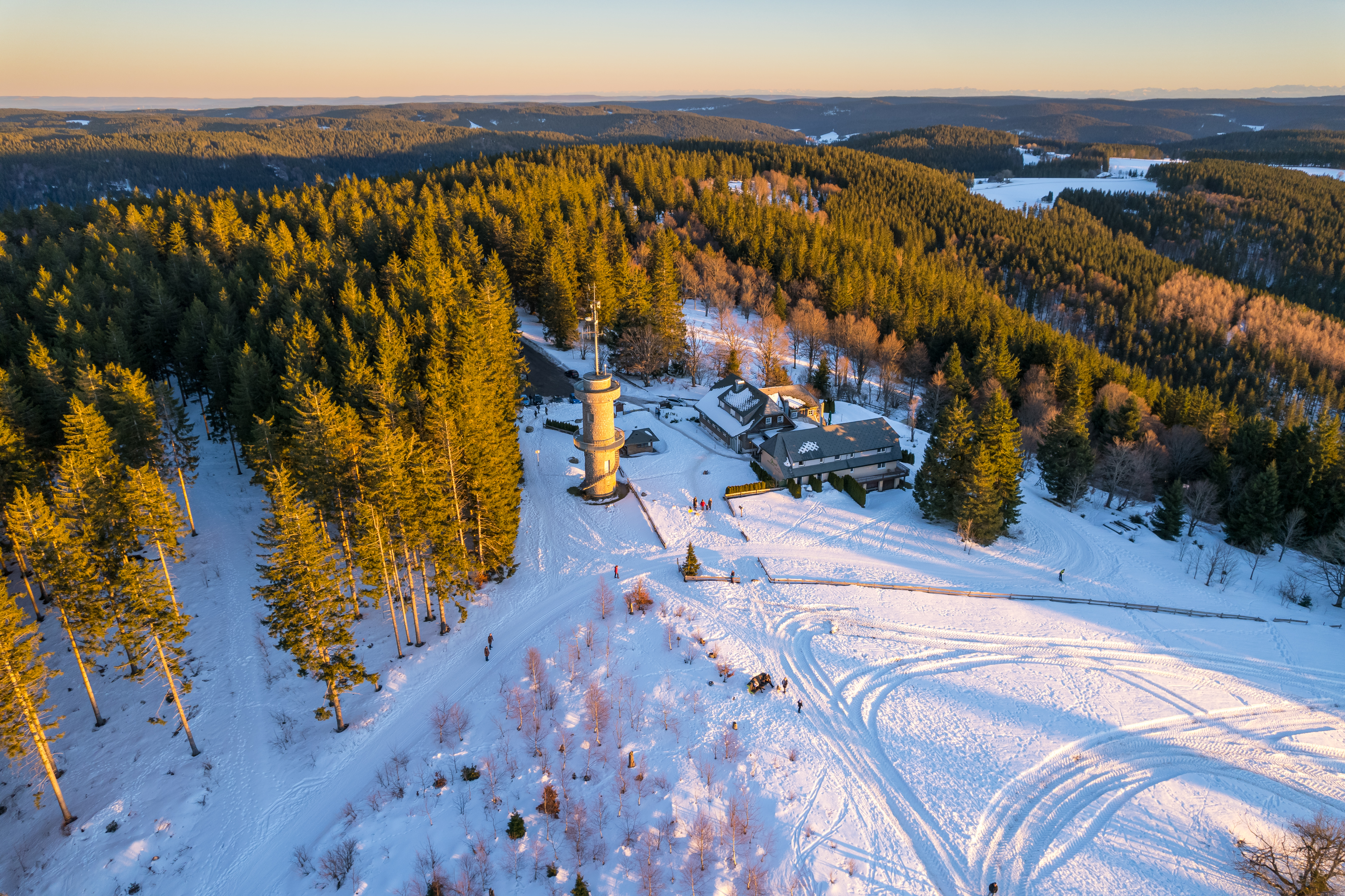
- Aerial photograph of the Brend

Highest point
- Elevation: 1,149 m (3,770 ft)
- Coordinates: 48°04′46″N 08°09′26″E

Geography
- Location within Baden-Württemberg
- Location: Baden-Württemberg, Germany
- Parent range: Central Black Forest

The Brend is a mountain, 1,149.3 m above sea level (NHN), in the Central Black Forest in Germany. It is the highest point in the borough of Furtwangen of which it is the Hausberg.

== Location ==
Located in the county of Schwarzwald-Baar-Kreis, the Brend is its second highest point after the elongated Rohrhardsberg-Farnberg Plateau. Before the 1973 county reform it was the highest point in the county of Donaueschingen.

The southern mountainside of the Brend lies in the parish of Simonswald in the county of Emmendingen. There it is the third highest point, together with the Rosseck, after the Kandel and the Rohrhardsberg-Farnberg Plateau. In the wake of an exchange of territory in 1977, ownership of the observation tower, the restaurant and a farmstead on the northwestern slopes was transferred from Obersimonswald, Emmendingen, to the town of Furtwangen, Schwarzwald-Baar-Kreis.

In clear weather the summit has good all-round view that includes the Hochfirst, Feldberg, Belchen, Schauinsland and Kandel. To the south may be seen the chain of the Swiss Alps from Säntis in the Appenzell Alps to the mountain trio of the Eiger, Mönch and Jungfrau in the Bernese Oberland, to the northwest the Vosges from Gazon de Faîte to Mont Sainte-Odile and to the east the Trauf of the Swabian Jura from the Zollernalb to the Hegaualb. At the summit, in addition to the Gasthaus and the Brendturm tower is a Friends of Nature House.

Together with the adjacent Rohrhardsberg to the north the Brend forms one of the largest and, at 1,100 metres, one of the highest highland areas of the Black Forest. The highlands belong to the largest natural regions in the state of Baden-Württemberg that is not bisected by through roads. It is only accessible on cul-de-sac roads. The summit itself and a large barbecue area are accessible from Furtwangen or Gütenbach by car.
