= Central Black Forest =

Natural division of the Black Forest of Germany

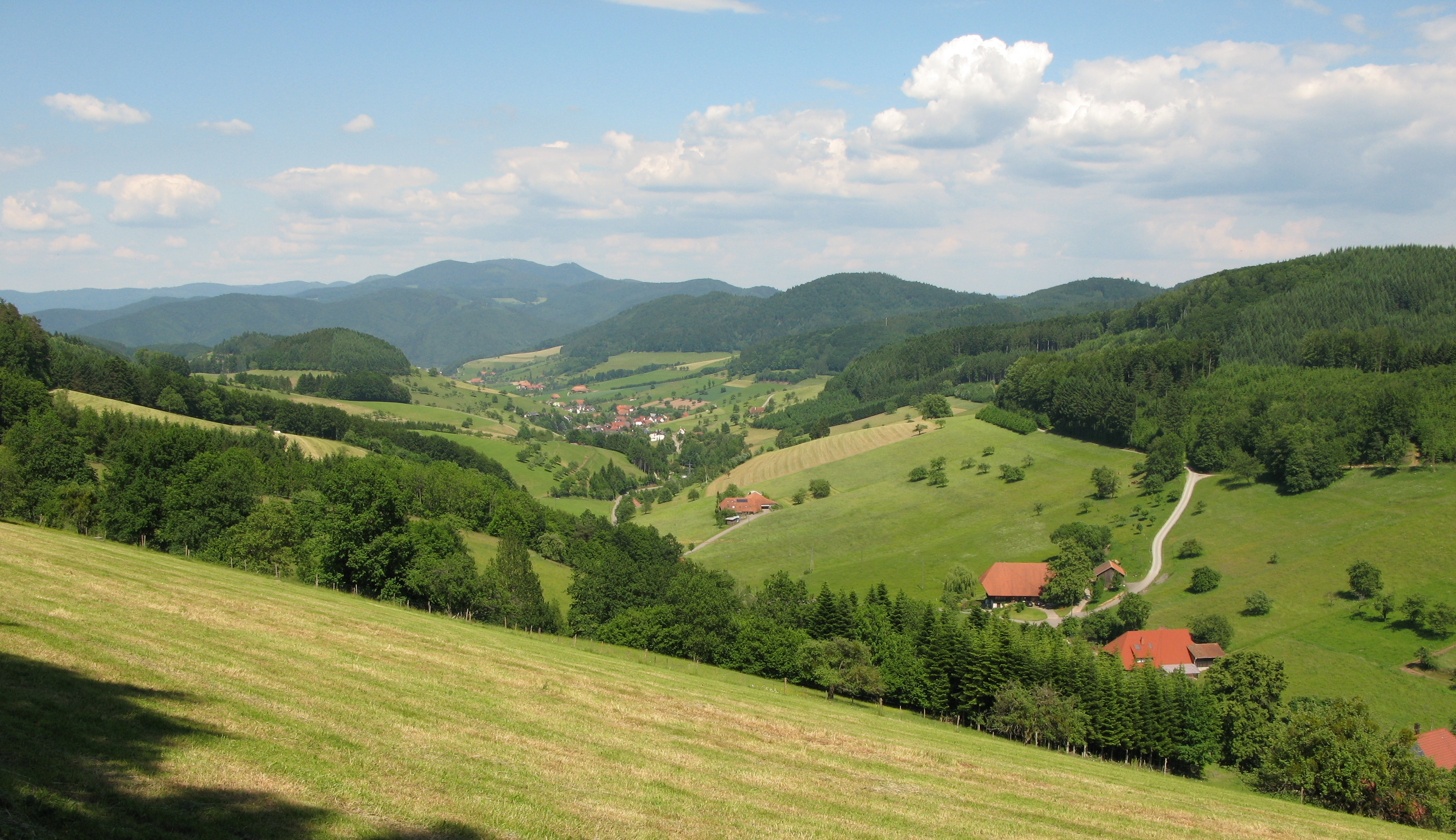
Typical landscape near the Kinzig valley: view over Welschensteinach to the Brandenkopf (945 m)

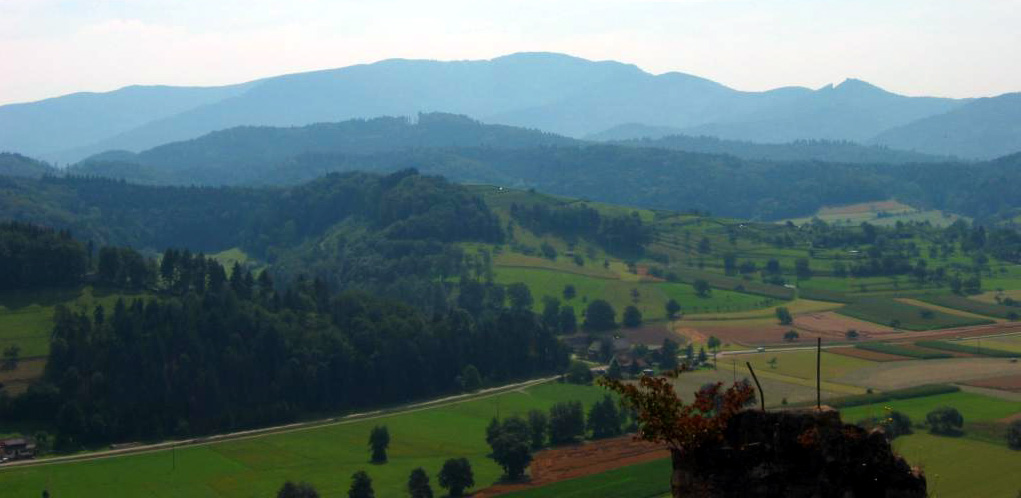
The Kandel (1,241 m) from the NW (Hochburg)

The Central Black Forest (German: Mittlerer Schwarzwald), also called the Middle Black Forest, is a natural or cultural division of the Black Forest in Baden-Württemberg in Germany. It generally refers to a region of deeply incised valleys from the Rench valley and southern foothills of the Kniebis in the north to the area of Freiburg im Breisgau and Donaueschingen in the south. Its highest area, which is southeast of the Elz valley, is also part of the High Black Forest.

== Geography ==
The dominating valley system of the Kinzig cuts through the Middle Black Forest from east to west. Prominent peaks are the Kandel (1,241 m), Weißtannenhöhe (1,190 m), Obereck (1,177 m), Rohrhardsberg (1,152 m), Brend (1,149 m), Stöcklewald (1,067 m) and Mooswaldkopf (887 m) south of the Kinzig, and the Brandenkopf (945 m) and Lettstädter Höhe (960 m) north of the Kinzig.

== Geology ==
Gneisses and granites predominate. Unlike the Northern Black Forest the Bunter sandstone covering with its plateau-like mountain shapes has only survived in a few places on the eastern perimeter. Elsewhere the land is marked by narrow ridges and valley floors or, especially in the southeast or even in island-like remnants, hilly highland valley landscapes.

The average height of the Central Black Forest is rather lower than in the Northern and Southern Black Forest. Relative heights are, however, similar; steep mountainsides can rise to 700 metres above the valley bottoms (e.g. in the valley of Simonswälder Tal).

== Significant sub-landscapes and natural monuments ==
- Glottertal (well known from the TV series, Die Schwarzwaldklinik)
- Elz valley
- Simonswälder Tal, valley of the Wilde Gutach
- Berneck valley, gorge on the upper Schiltach
- Kostgfäll Gorge
- Triberg Waterfalls
- Zweribach Waterfalls
- Burgbach Waterfall
- Glaswaldsee, lake below the Lettstädter Höhe

== Significant settlements and cultural monuments ==
- Black Forest Open Air Museum, Vogtsbauernhof
- German Clock Museum in Furtwangen
- Timber-framed towns of Schiltach and Haslach im Kinzigtal
- Wolfach, glassworks and old town quarter
- Gengenbach, once a free imperial city (old town with abbey and town fortifications)
- Alpirsbach, Romanesque abbey (built from around 1050), one of the few surviving in the Hirsauer Style
- Zell am Harmersbach, formerly the smallest free imperial city in the Holy Roman Empire, timber-framed buildings and Jugendstil
- Schramberg, important industrial town of the Central Black Forest
- St. Peter's Abbey with Baroque library and abbey church
- Villingen-Schwenningen, largest town on the eastern perimeter of the Central Black Forest
- Triberg with its waterfall and the Black Forest Local History Museum
- St. Georgen with its Phono Museum

== Footpaths ==
- Hansjakobweg I (3 day circular walk)
- Hansjakobweg II (4 day circular walk)
- Rottweil–Lahr Black Forest Trail (4 days)
- Gengenbach–Alpirsbach Black Forest Trail (2–3 days)
- Mittelweg
- Ostweg (long distance path)
- Westweg (long distance path)
- Kandelhöhenweg (5 days)
- Zweitälersteig (5 days, long distance path)
