= Lettstädter Höhe =

Mountain in Baden-Württemberg, Germany

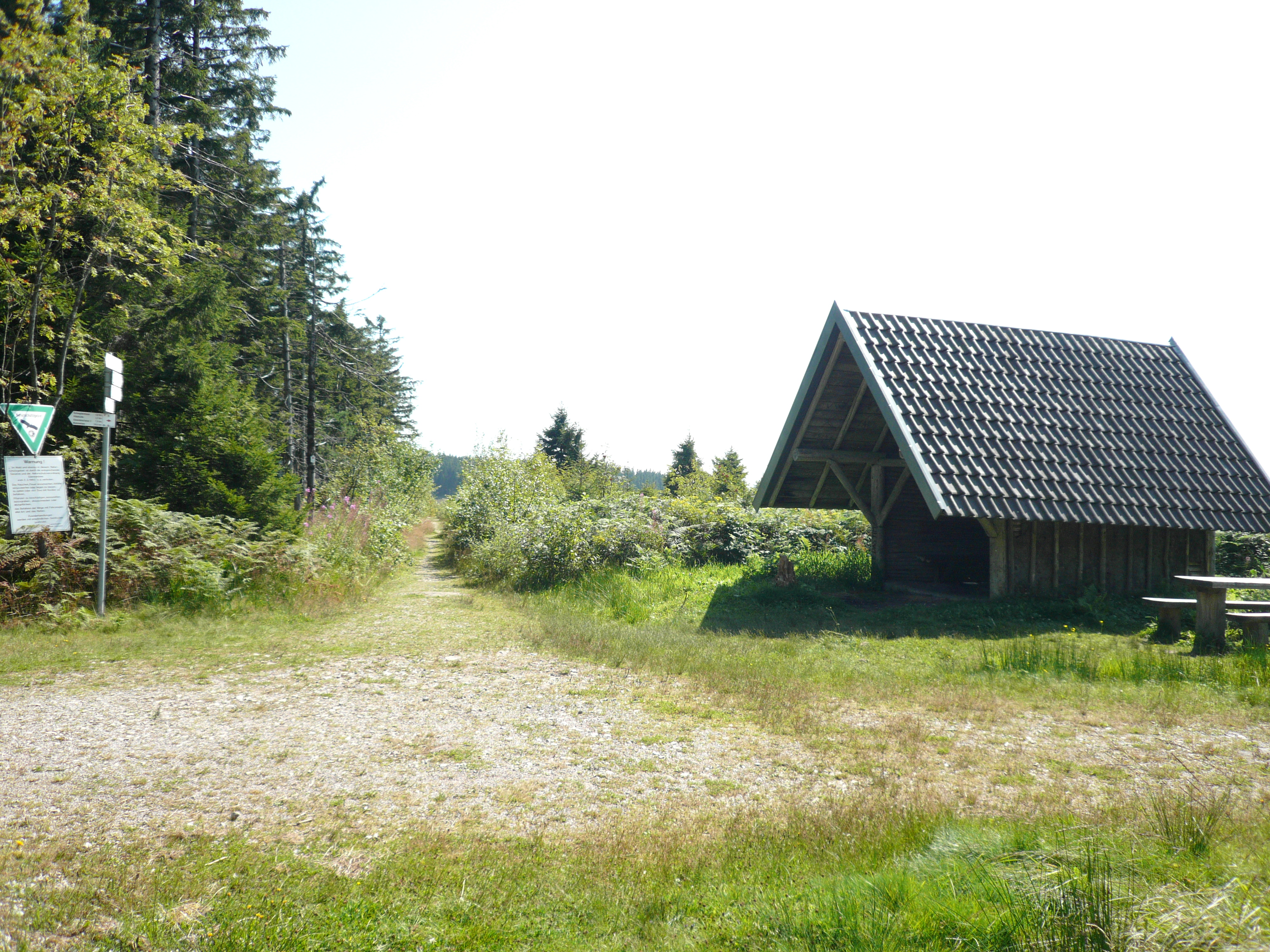
- On the Lettstädter Höhe

Highest point
- Elevation: 966 m above sea level (NHN) (3,169 ft)
- Coordinates: 48°26′03″N 8°15′20″E

Geography
- Location within Baden-Württemberg
- Location: Baden-Württemberg, Germany
- Parent range: Black Forest

The Lettstädter Höhe is a mountain in the Central Black Forest region of in Germany, southwest of Kniebis.

It has a height of 966 metres.

The Lettstädter Höhe lies in a walking region on the Westweg trail from Pforzheim to Basel on the seventh stage between the Alexanderschanze and the Bergbauernhof Hark.
