= Mooswaldkopf =

Mountain in Baden-Württemberg, Germany

Coordinates: 48°14′28″N 8°18′04″E

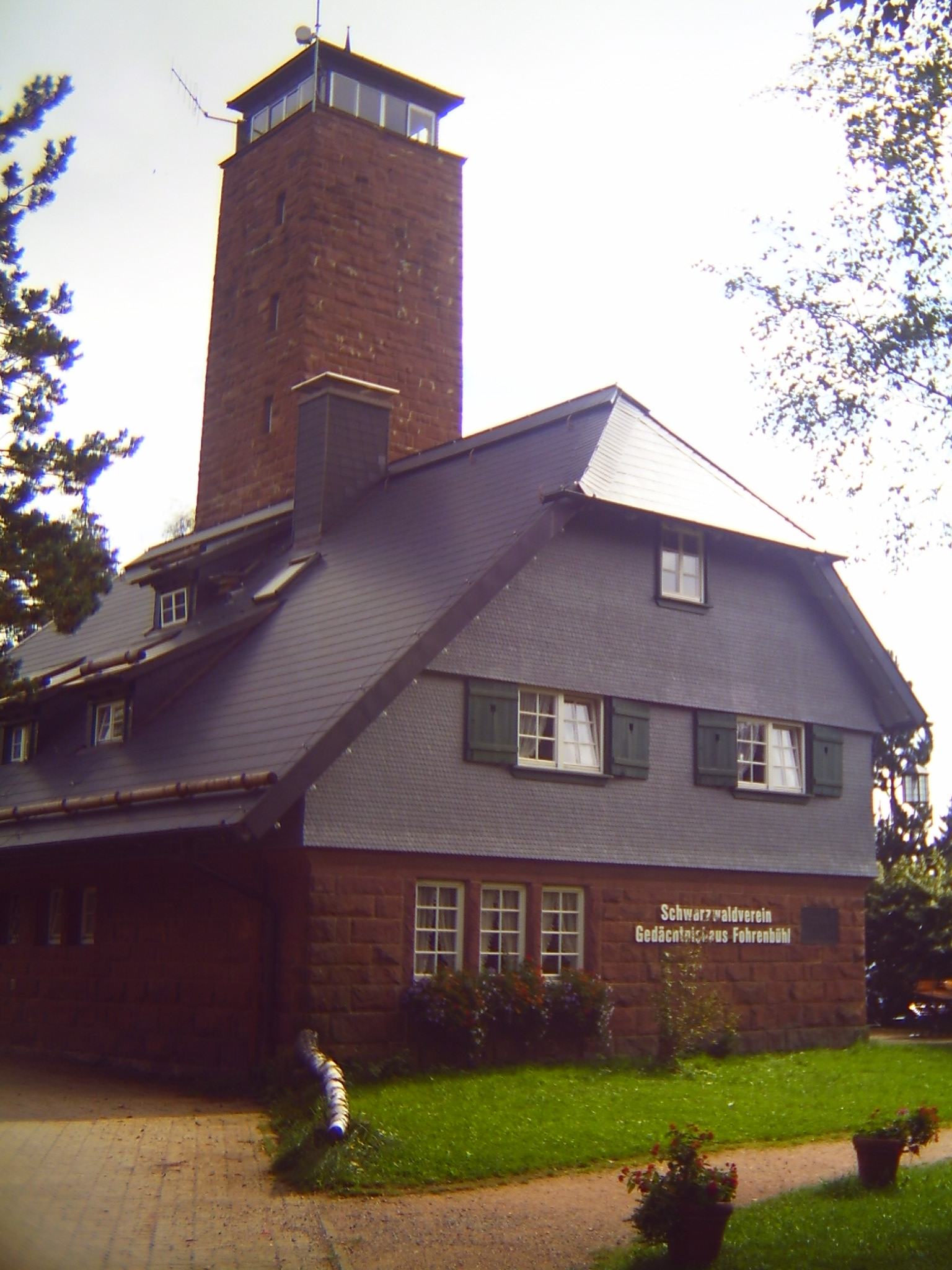
- A memorial house on the Mooswaldkopf

Highest point
- Elevation: 879 m (2,884 ft)

Geography
- Location: Baden-Württemberg, Germany

Mooswaldkopf is a mountain of Baden-Württemberg, Germany.
