= Hexenloch Mill =

Building in Bade-Württemberg, Germany

Coordinates: 48.00924°N 8.139759°E

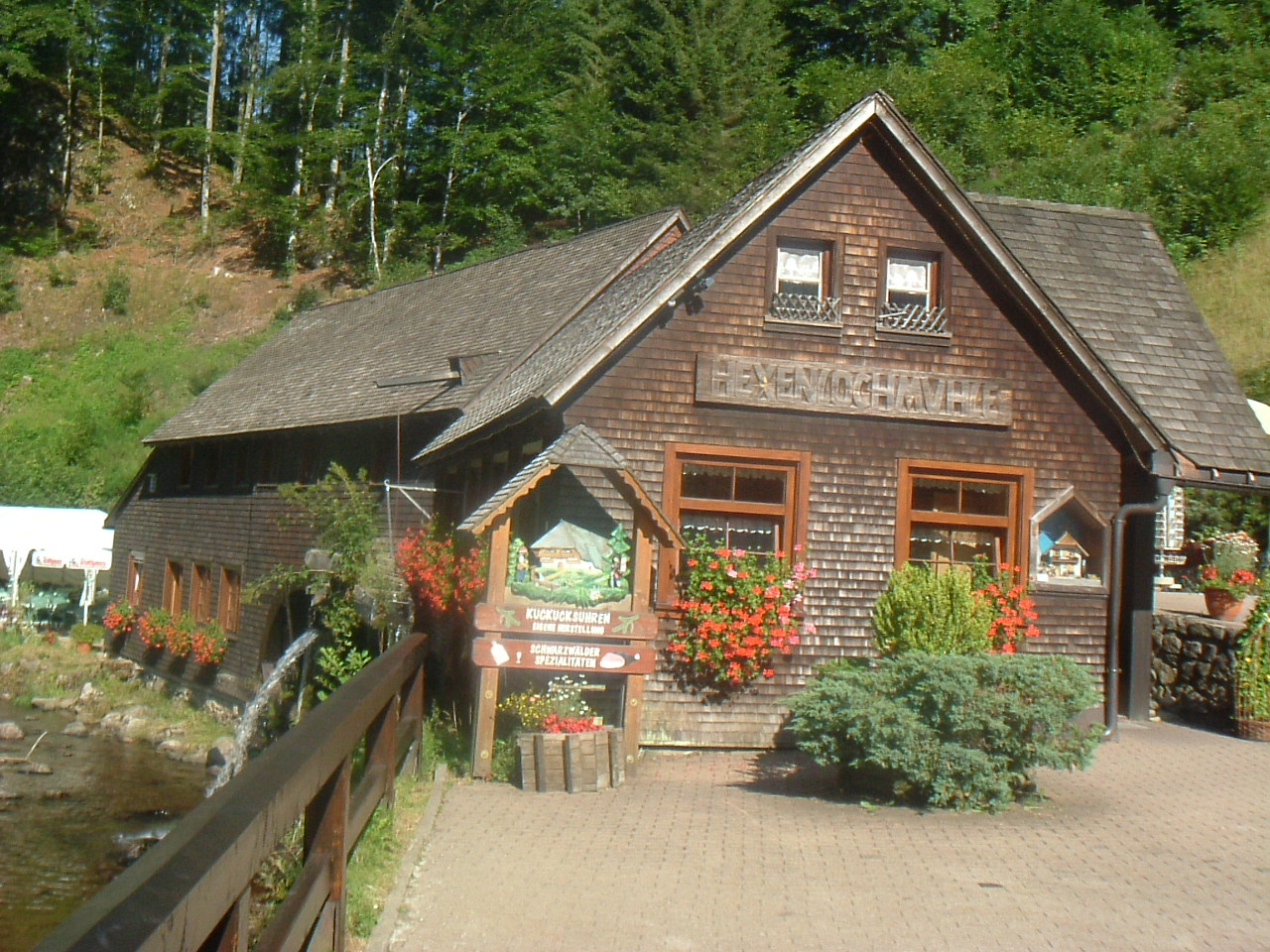
The Hexenloch Mill

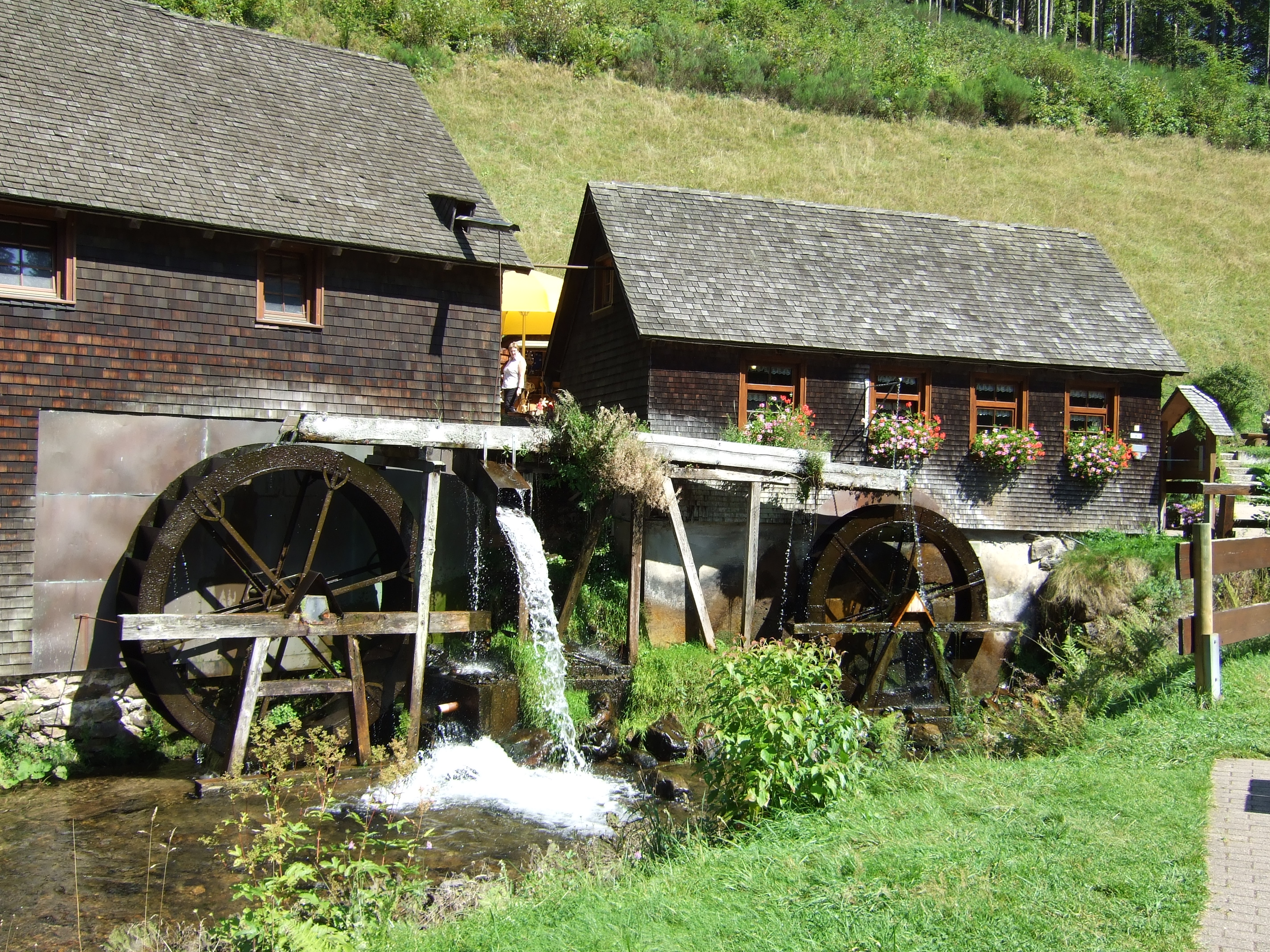
The Hexenlochmühle

The Hexenloch Mill (German: Hexenlochmühle, lit. "Witch's Hole Mill"), formerly the Dreistegen Mill (Dreistegenmühle), lies in the ravine-like Hexenloch (also sometimes called the Hexenloch valley, but not often by the locals) in the Black Forest in Germany between St. Märgen and Furtwangen in the parish of Furtwangen-Neukirch. It was built in 1825 and has been in the same family since 1839.

It is the only mill in the Black Forest with two water wheels. In 1825, the part with the smaller water wheel was built as a nail smithy. Later, the part with the larger water wheel was built as a sawmill. Eventually the nail smithy was turned into a workshop for the clockmaking works.

The mill and restaurant are open daily all year round, with the exception for 2 weeks in March.
