= Sankt Peter, Baden-Württemberg =

St. Peter
- Municipality
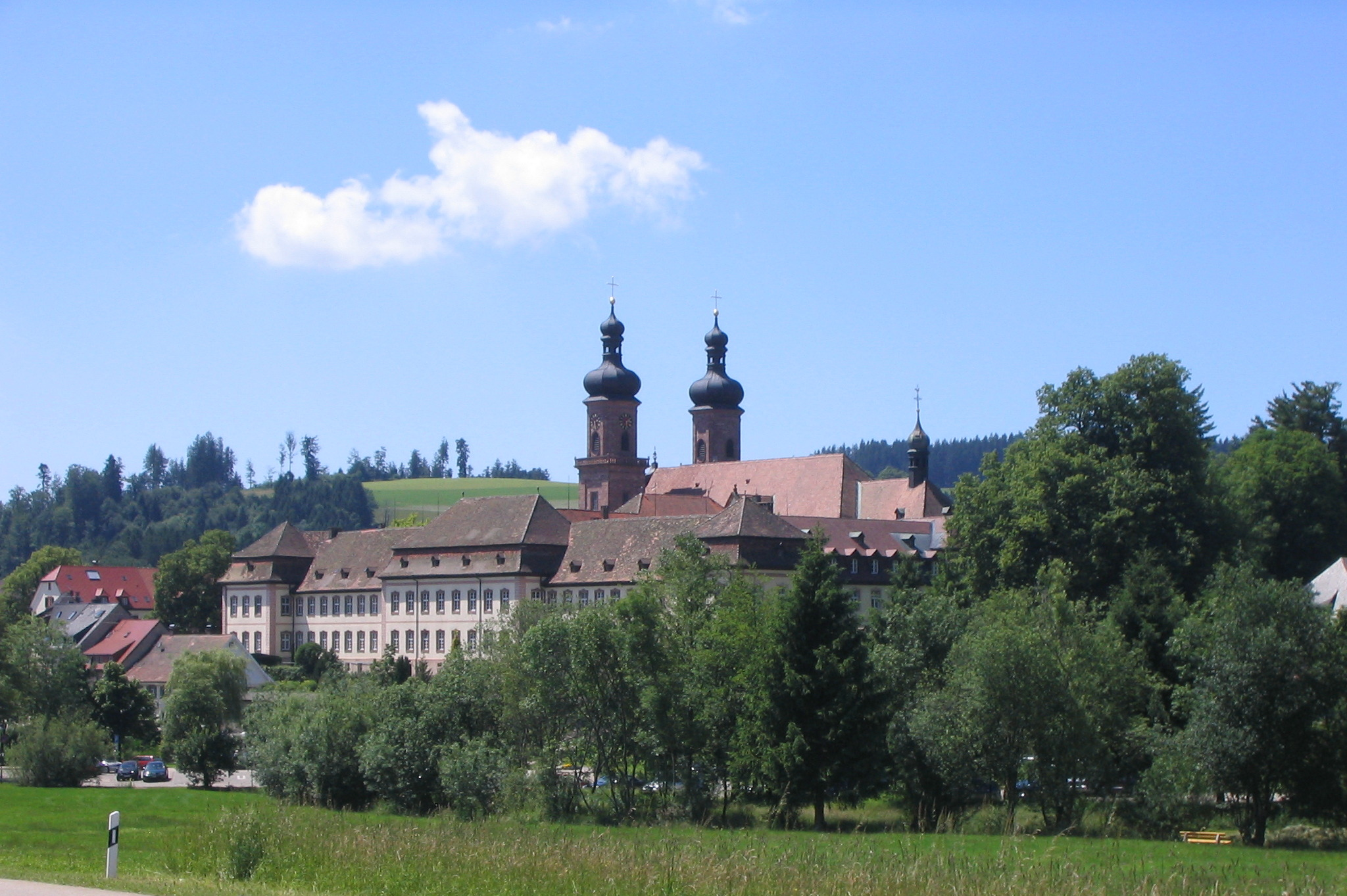
- Abbey of St. Peter in the Black Forest

- Coat of arms

- Location of St. Peter within Breisgau-Hochschwarzwald district
- Interactive map of St. Peter
- Location within Germany Location within Baden-Württemberg
- Coordinates: 48°0′59″N 8°1′57″E
- Country: Germany
- State: Baden-Württemberg
- Admin. region: Freiburg
- District: Breisgau-Hochschwarzwald

Government
  - Mayor (2016–24): Rudolf Schuler (Ind.)

Area
  - Total: 35.93 km^{2} (13.87 sq mi)
- Elevation: 716 m (2,349 ft)

Population (2025-12-31)
  - Total: 2,718
  - Density: 75.65/km^{2} (195.9/sq mi)
- Time zone: UTC+01:00 (CET)
  - Summer (DST): UTC+02:00 (CEST)
- Postal codes: 79271
- Dialling codes: 07660
- Vehicle registration: FR
- Website: www.st-peter-schwarzwald.de

St. Peter (German pronunciation: [zaŋkt ˈpeːtɐ]; sometimes spelled in full as Sankt Peter) is a municipality in the district of Breisgau-Hochschwarzwald in Baden-Württemberg in Germany.

== Geography ==
=== Location ===
St. Peter is a climatic spa located within the Southern Black Forest Nature Park, on the southern flank of the Kandel, about 12 miles east of Freiburg im Breisgau.

=== Administrative structure ===
To the municipality of St. Peter belong the village of Bürgerschaft, the hamlet of Sägendobel, the settlements of Kandelberg, Neuwelt, Oberibental, Ränke, Rohr, Schmittenbach, Schönhöfe, Seelgut and Willmendobel and the farmsteads of Eckpeterhof, Langeck and Lindlehof.

== History ==
The Abbey of St. Peter in the Black Forest was founded in 1093 by the Duke of Zähringen, Berthold II as his house abbey and family burial site. The municipality developed gradually over time around the abbey.

When the estates of the Church were seized and sold or transferred during Napoleon's conquest of Europe, the village of St. Peter was handed to the Grand Duchy of Baden in 1806 and, since 1952, they have been part of the state of Baden-Württemberg.

In 1899, fire broke out in the village centre of St. Peter, whereupon 23 houses were destroyed and 150 people made homeless.

At the end of the Second World War there was a Reich training centre of the Hitler Youth in St. Peter.

Population growth
Year	1806	1871	1900	1925	1939	1950	1961	1970	1989	1995	2005	2010	2015
Population	1480	1308	1383	1378	1426	1500	1529	1797	2207	2362	2508	2547	2583

Source: Statistisches Landesamt Baden-Württemberg (except 1806); 1871–1970: Census results

== Gallery ==
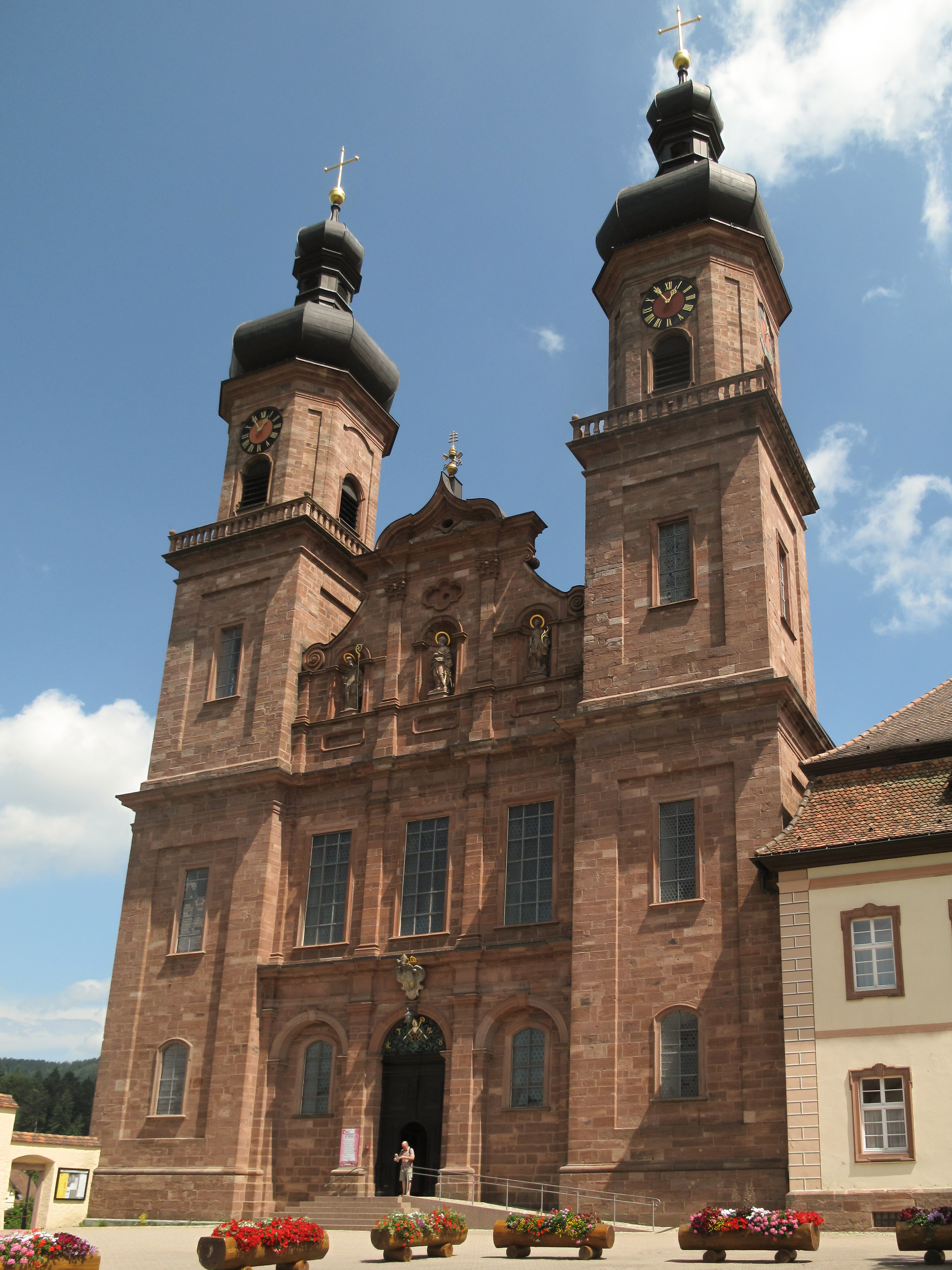
The abbey church of St. Peter and St. Paul

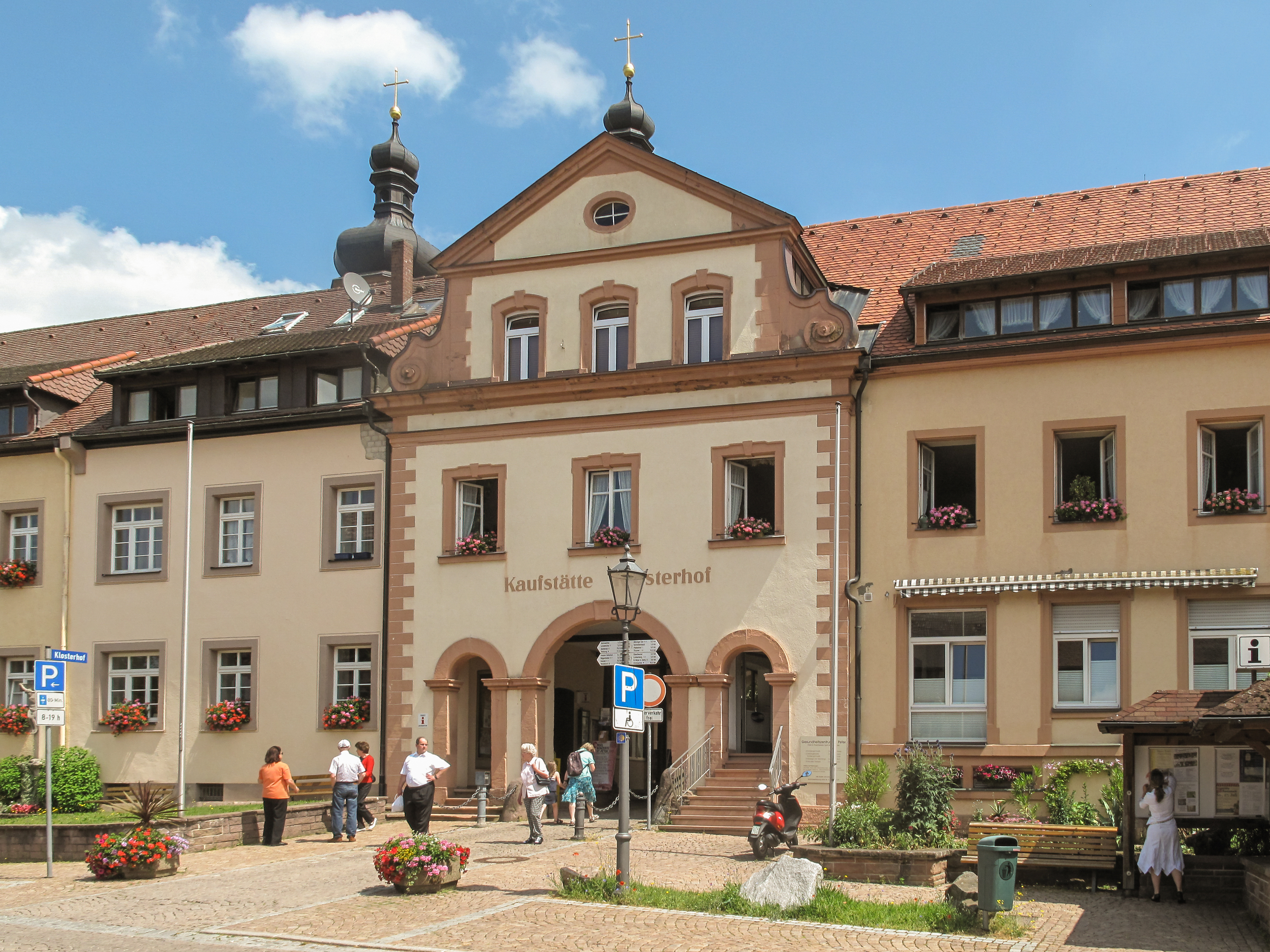
Gateway to the abbey courtyard (Klosterhof)

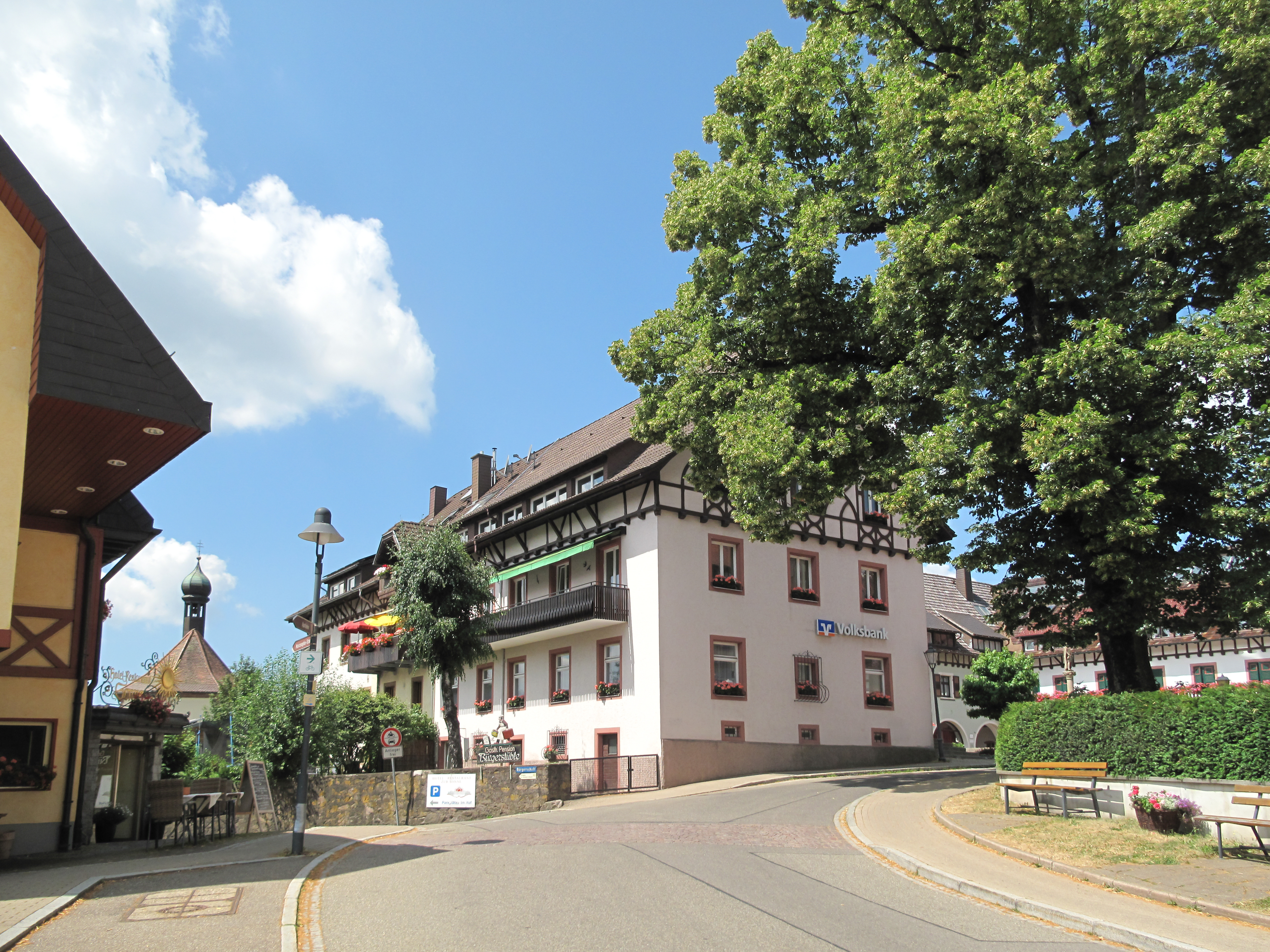
Steyrer Strasse

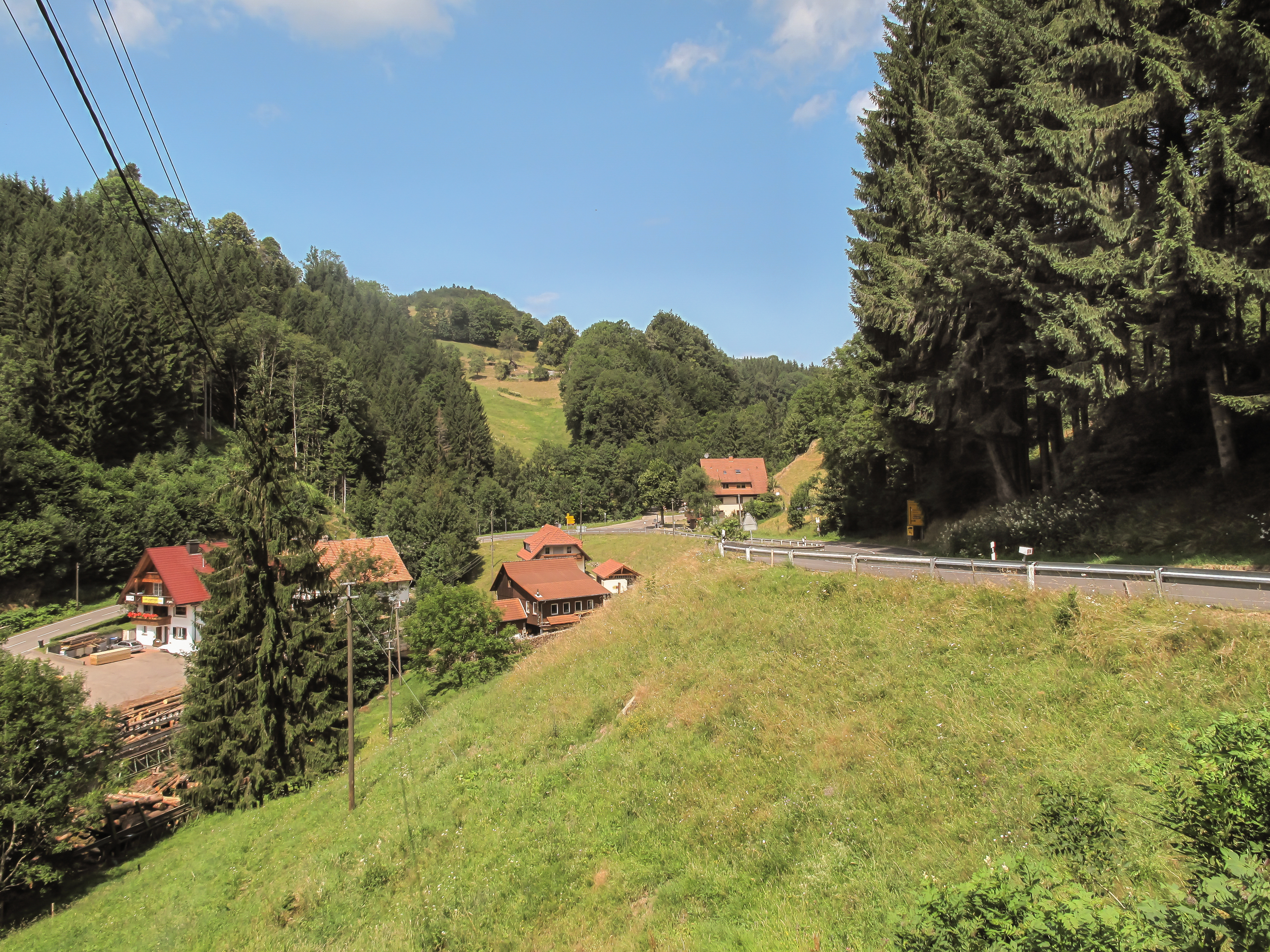
Panorama between Sankt Peter and the Glottertal valley
