= Gutach im Breisgau =

- Municipality
- Coat of arms

- Location of Gutach im Breisgau within Emmendingen district
- Interactive map of Gutach im Breisgau
- Location within Germany Location within Baden-Württemberg
- Coordinates: 48°7′4″N 7°59′23″E
- Country: Germany
- State: Baden-Württemberg
- Admin. region: Freiburg
- District: Emmendingen
- Subdivisions: 5

Government
  - Mayor (2022–30): Sebastian Rötzer

Area
  - Total: 24.77 km^{2} (9.56 sq mi)
- Elevation: 293 m (961 ft)

Population (2025-12-31)
  - Total: 4,679
  - Density: 188.9/km^{2} (489.2/sq mi)
- Time zone: UTC+01:00 (CET)
  - Summer (DST): UTC+02:00 (CEST)
- Postal codes: 79261
- Dialling codes: 07681/07685
- Vehicle registration: EM
- Website: www.gutach.de

Gutach im Breisgau (German pronunciation: [ˈɡuːtax ʔɪm ˈbʁaɪsɡaʊ], lit. 'Gutach in the Breisgau'; Low Alemannic: Guetich im Brisgau) is a municipality in the district of Emmendingen in Baden-Württemberg in Germany.

Gutach includes six villages:

- Gutach
- Bleibach
- Siegelau
- Stollen
- Kregelbach
- Oberspitzenbach

== Twin towns ==
Worthing, United Kingdom
