= Kandel (mountain) =

Mountain in Baden-Württemberg, Germany

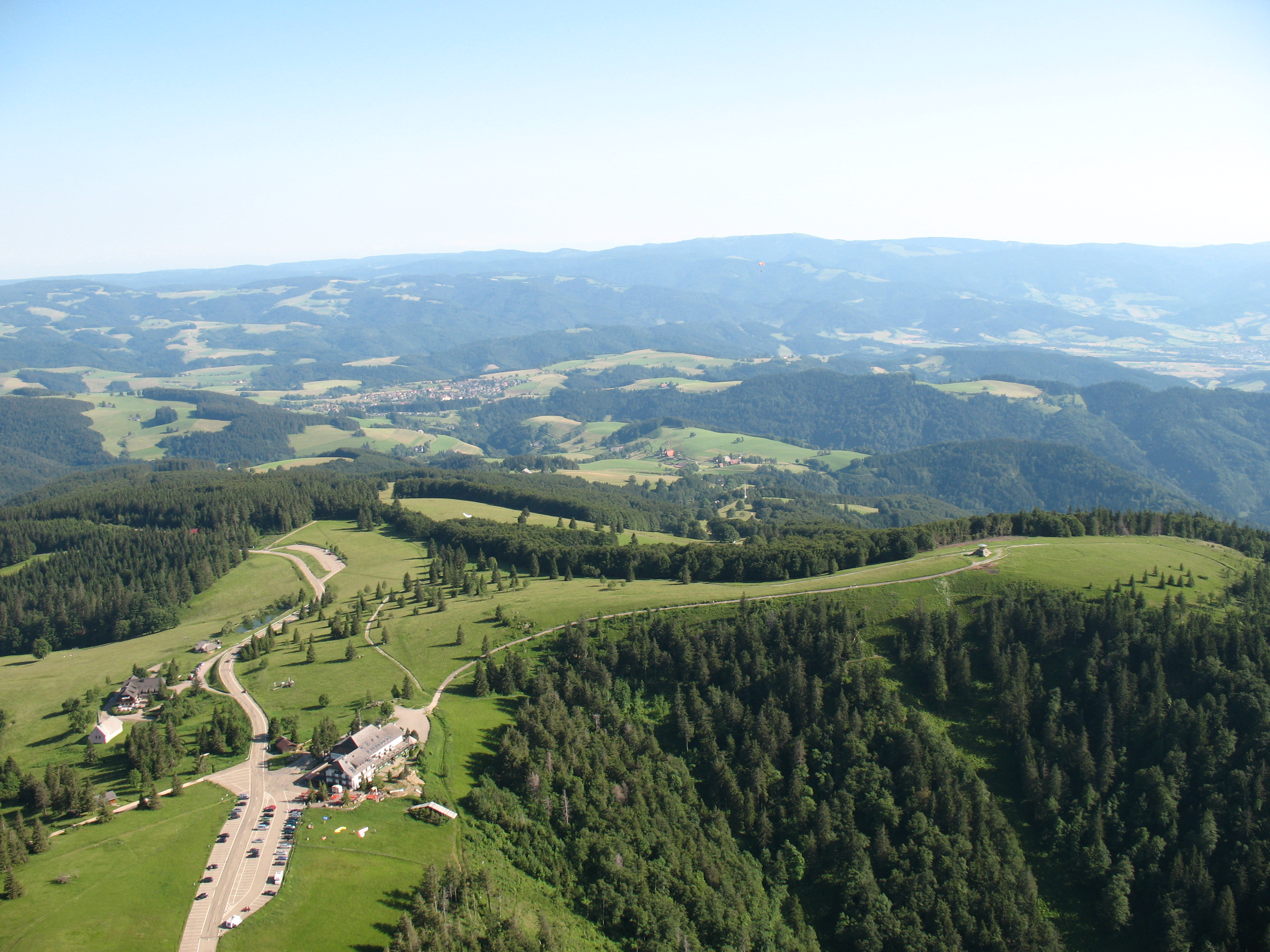
- Summit with Kandelhof, Berghotel and pyramid (from left to right)

Highest point
- Elevation: 1,241.4 m (4,073 ft)
- Isolation: 17.78 km (11.05 mi) to Wiesenwaldkopf
- Coordinates: 48°03′44″N 08°00′43″E

Geography
- Location within Baden-Württemberg
- Location: Baden-Württemberg, Germany
- Parent range: Black Forest

The Kandel is a mountain, 1,241.4 metres high, in the Black Forest in the south of Baden-Württemberg, Germany.

== Geography ==
The Kandel is located 25 km northeast of Freiburg in the Breisgau and has a height of 1,241 m (4,072 ft).

The Kandel belongs to the Central Black Forest gneiss region. The overall shape of the massif was tectonically formed: the Kandel block rises table-like in a northwesterly direction from the plateau around Sankt Peter. It is surrounded by faults, some of which form clear steps in the terrain; for example the Rhine Plain lies more than 1,000 metres below the Kandel and the summits on the other side of the Elz valley are 500–600 metres lower. The ongoing uplifting of the Kandel block from the Rhine Plain (1–2 mm/year) sometimes manifests itself in earth tremors.

The Kandel massif is cut by deep radial valleys into mountain ridges, some rounded and some rocky. The steep mountainsides reach heights of 600 metres in the southwest (Glotter valley), 650 metres in the northwest (Elz valley) and a good 700 metres in the northeast (valley of the Wild Gutach). Only in the southeast does the mountain descend more gradually towards Sankt Peter by about 500 metres and to the ledge over the Zweribach waterfalls by a good 200 metres. The extensive grasslands of the southern slopes often exhibit clear thermals and are influenced by heavy thunderstorm weather patterns of the Breisgau that often arise here.

The elements of the mountain block that go back to the ice age glaciations are less obvious here than in other Black Forest mountains of comparable height.

=== Kandel Rock ===
Kandel Rock (German: Kandelfelsen) is located at a height of about 1,100 m (3,609 ft) on the western slope. Although in 1981, some two thousand cubic metres of rock collapsed, it is still attractive to climbers. Its upper part is called the Devil's Pulpit, because legend has it that this is the place where witches come together to dance with the devil on Walpurgis Night (Walpurgisnacht), which is the night of 30 April/1 May. The rockfall on the Devil's Pulpit occurred on Walpurgis Night in 1981.

== Sports and leisure activities ==
The Kandel offers various leisure activities which are typical for mountainous regions, including hiking and biking trails, for example the southern part of the Kandelhöhenweg. The Kandel Rock (German: Großer Kandelfels) can be climbed and there are starting points for hang-gliding and paragliding. The mountain is also famous for its drive up, which is used by racing cyclists. The road is 12 km (7.5 mi) long and covers a difference in height of 926 meters (3038 ft), so it has a gradient of 7.7%. The summit can also be reached by bus starting in St. Peter up to five times a day.

In 2000, the Kandel was the third stage of the Deutschland Tour. Udo Bölts was the first one who reached the summit. An individual time trial took place within the context of the Regio-Tour on August 13, 2015. Tony Martin won the race with a time of 33 minutes and 43 seconds. Further, there is a so-called “Kandel marathon” every year. The route starts at the market place of Waldkirch, it is 12.2 km (7.58 mi) long and covers a difference in height of 940 m (3084 ft). The time of Wolfgang Muenzel, who ran the marathon in 48 minutes and 39 seconds, has been unbeaten since 1986.

In Winter, there are ski lifts in the summit region and a 5 km (3.12 mi) long cross-country skiing trail is being prepared if snow conditions are good. Ski mountaineering is also possible. Even though slopes near the summit sometimes don't have ski lifts, skiers still go skiing in these areas. The most precipitous descent is the so-called Nordhang (once called Hess-Hang) which was built in 1934 and which is the highest part of the former descent to Waldkirch. The Bergwacht Schwarzwald, a mountain rescue which has a station on the Kandel, is responsible for the mountain rescue service in the region.

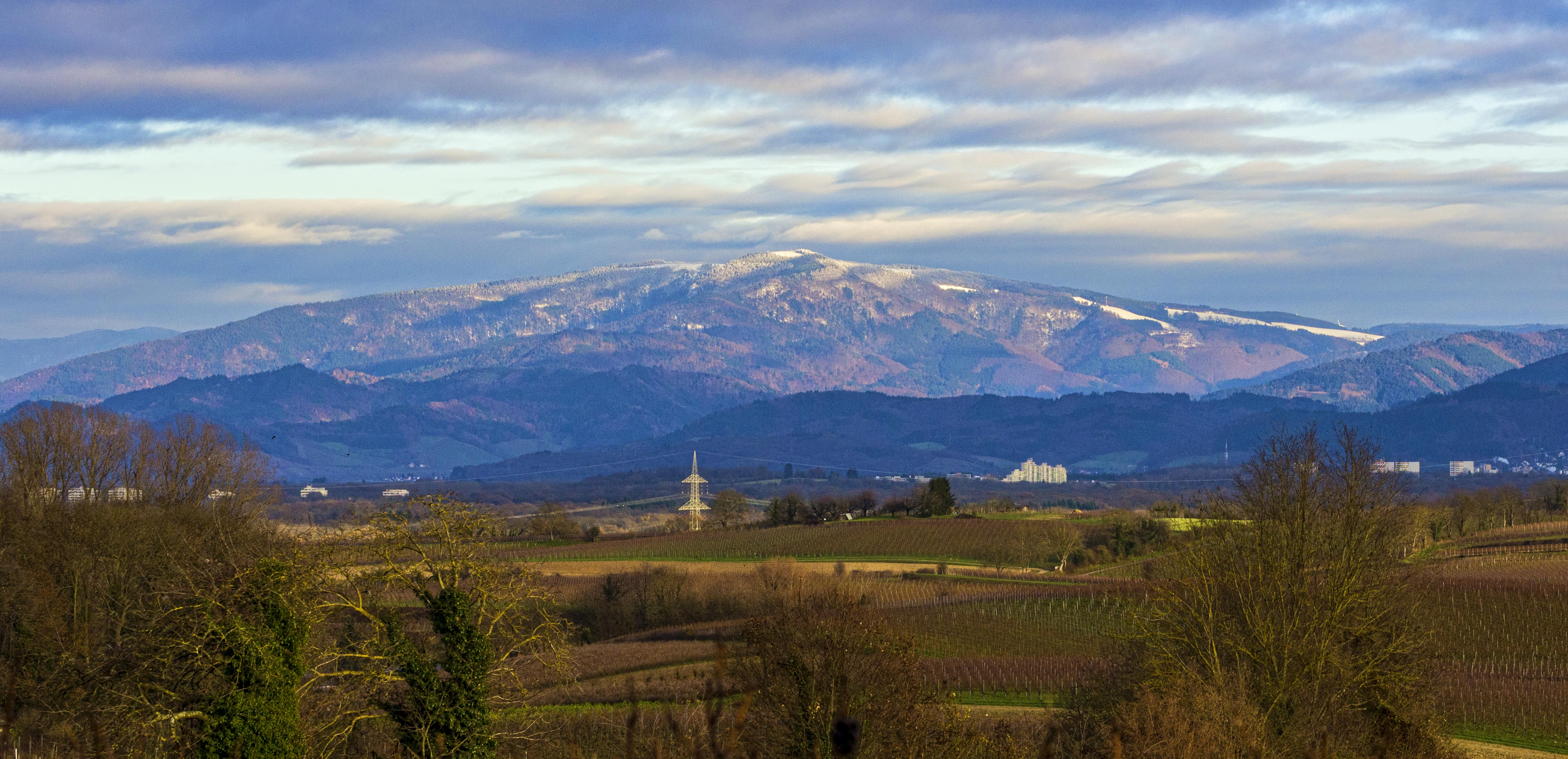
The Kandel

== Attractions ==
In the early modern period, the Kandel was known as the “Blockula of the Black Forest”. The Elztal was a hot-spot for witch-hunting in Germany. The Walpurgis Night is a tradition that is still practiced today. According to a myth, the witch Gfällrote was haunting the region around the Kandel.

The upper part of the Kandel Rock, the so-called Teufelskanzel (Devil’s Pulpit), collapsed in the night from April 30 to March 1, 1981. Roughly 2,000 cubic meters of stone became loose, fell down and have been lying underneath the rock since then. Some residents believed in a demonic origin of the rockfall as it happened in the Walpurgis Night and a broom was found in the rubble. The reason for the rockfall is still unknown as seismic analysis excluded an earthquake. The geographer Werner Bätzing assumed that the reason was frost weathering which often happens during spring as water freezes and thaws alternately. Icicles were found in the rubble supporting the frost weathering hypothesis. The broom belonged to Peter Rambach, a rock mechanic, who performed safety measures in the months before the collapse.

On December 5, 2004, there was an earthquake of magnitude 5.43. The epicenter was in the area of Waldkirch/Kandelmassiv, the center of the earthquake was around 12 km (7.5 mi) further below.
