= Simonswald =

- Municipality
- Coat of arms

- Location of Simonswald within Emmendingen district
- Interactive map of Simonswald
- Location within Germany Location within Baden-Württemberg
- Coordinates: 48°6′1″N 8°3′21″E
- Country: Germany
- State: Baden-Württemberg
- Admin. region: Freiburg
- District: Emmendingen
- Subdivisions: 7

Government
  - Mayor (2017–25): Stephan Schonefeld

Area
  - Total: 74.31 km^{2} (28.69 sq mi)
- Elevation: 360 m (1,180 ft)

Population (2025-12-31)
  - Total: 2,976
  - Density: 40.05/km^{2} (103.7/sq mi)
- Time zone: UTC+01:00 (CET)
  - Summer (DST): UTC+02:00 (CEST)
- Postal codes: 79263
- Dialling codes: 07683
- Vehicle registration: EM
- Website: www.simonswald.de

Simonswald (Low Alemannic: Simeschwald) is a town in the district of Emmendingen in Baden-Württemberg in Germany.

== History ==
Simonswald was first documented in 1178 as Sigmanswalt and belonged to the holdings of the St. Margarethen convent in Waldkirch. In 1316, Simonswald came into the possession of the Schwarzenberg family of Kastelburg Castle, and in 1805 it was transferred from the Landgraviate of Further Austria (Breisgau) to the Grand Duchy of Baden.

The municipality was formed on April 1, 1970, through the merger of the municipalities of Altsimonswald, Haslachsimonswald, and Untersimonswald. On January 1, 1974, the two previously independent municipalities of Obersimonswald and Wildgutach were incorporated.

== Twin towns ==
Worthing, United Kingdom
