= Gewässerkennzahl =

Identifier with which all watercourses in Germany are numbered

The Gewässerkennzahl (GKZ, rarely GWK or GEWKZ) or "waterbody index number/waterbody number" is an identifier with which all watercourses in Germany are numbered, together with their catchments and precipitation areas. It is also referred to as a Gebietskennzahl or "basin number". A Gewässerkennzahl may have up to 13 figures (theoretically even 19). Basins normally are only defined up to seven figures. For a more detailed subdivision, the Gewässerkennzahl may be enlarged by ten more figures. Only that enlarged version is called Fließgewässerkennziffer. The Gewässerkennzahlen are defined by the environment offices of the states.

== History ==
In order to have comparable values and usable data across the state of Germany, the Federal and State Water Authorities agreed in December 1970 to create a unified system for hydrological work on certain important rivers and their above-ground catchment areas and to issue them with index numbers. Linked to that was the establishment of the size and boundaries of their catchment areas.

== Principle ==
Every waterbody (streams, rivers, canals and ditches, but also lakes and even some bays) and its catchment area was given a waterbody number in such a way that it could be clearly identified. The waterbody numbers are built in hierarchical fashion so that, based on the number, the next river system of the waterbody can be deduced.

=== Scheme ===
At first the course of water has to be defined from source to mouth. Then the four major tributaries (or 'affluents') are identified. They are marked by even figures in downstream sequence, "-2, -4, -6, -8". This way, the (main) course is divided into five sections, which are marked by odd figures, "-1, -3, -5, -7, -9". A number with an even end-digit is the number of a whole watercourse, while a number with an odd end-digit is the number of a section. Lowest sections are always given a nine, even if not all figures between one and nine have been used. In the next step of numbering, each section defined by the first step is dealt in the same way, selecting four major tributaries and marking five sections.

=== Lakes ===
Lakes are integrated as a part of the watercourse formed by their main tributary and their outlet.

=== Coastal regions ===
For coastal regions, the scheme of numbering was altered in different ways by different states:

- Lower Saxony left the rule of using only odd numbers for sections. Nevertheless, bay as dependent waterbodies got even numbers.
- Mecklenburg-Vorpommern stuck to using even numbers for important rivers and odd numbers for – here coastal – sections in between. But the course of the coast was defined in a way, that in two straits different third figures were used for their two banks.

=== Waterbodies without a Gewässerkennzahl ===
Some waterbodies indexed under this classification system have un-indexed headstreams or lateral tributaries in the form of very small streams or ditches. If such an unclassified waterbody is relevant for the water management of the region, it may be given a number within the local classification system of the regional Wasser- und Bodenverband (association for water and ground management).

=== Catchment areas ===
The numbers for a watercourse and its catchment area are thus identical. If a river has subsidiary watercourses, an additional figure is allocated to its index number for each further branch. So in theory even a rivulet could be allocated its own catchment. In practice, catchment numbering for water sources below the level of streams is not used.

Catchment areas are thus distinguished by a number with up to a maximum of seven digits. Watercourse index numbers, by contrast, may have up to 13 digits in order to be able to classify all their tributaries and headstreams; although in practice only 10 digits are used.

=== Main river systems ===
The first digit of the number indicates which major river basin the waterbody belongs to, as follows:

- 1 Danube
- 2 Rhine
- 3 Ems
- 4 Weser
- 5 Elbe
- 6 Oder
- 9 Coastal region

The second and subsequent digits of the index number represent further subdivisions of the river and its catchment area.

=== Example ===
The Heusiepen stream in Remscheid has waterbody number 27366462. This can be decoded as follows:

Main stem system / catchment area Rhine (2)

→ River system / catchment area Wupper (2-736)

→ River system / catchment area Morsbach (2-736-6)

→ River system / catchment area Gelpe (2-736-6-4)

→ River system / catchment area Saalbach (2-736-6-4-6)

→ Stream without defined catchment area Heusiepen (2-736-6-4-6-2)

== Waterbody index numbers ==
Listed below are all the rivers with up to a three-figure index number, and some rivers with four-figure numbers above a length of 50 km.

=== 1 Danube ===
Number	Name	Length [km]	Catchment area [km²]
1	Danube (including the Breg)	2857	817,000
112	Lauchert	60.3	456
114	Iller (including the Breitach - Turabach)	147	2,147
1158	Günz	55	710
116	Mindel	81	962
1172	Brenz	52	880
118	Wörnitz	132	1,686
12	Lech	264	3,926
122	Archbach (river totally in Austria, basin partly in Germany)	10	145
124	Vils	36	198
126	Wertach	150	1,260
128	Lechkanal	14	19
132	Friedberger Ach (with Hagenbach–…–Verlorener Bach)	100	598
134	Paar	134	1,632
136	Abens	72	1020
138	Altmühl	234	2,251
14	Naab (including the Waldnaab)	165	5,432
142	Haidenaab	60	714
144	Pfreimd	56	595
146	Schwarzach	80	822
148	Vils	78	1,100
152	Left branch of Danube in Regensburg	3,6	2.881
1522	Regen (including Black Regen - Great Regen)	191	2,953
154	Pfatter	37	262
156	Große Laber	75	407
158	Kinsach–Ferchenbach	38	317
16	Isar	295	8,370
162	Loisach	113	954
164	Amper (with Ammer, Linder, Fischbach, Rückentalbach)	209	3,248
166	Mittlerer Isarkanal (Middle Isar Canal)	64,7	1,147
168	Plattlinger Mühlbach (with Längenmühlbach)	75	345
172	Hengersberger Ohe (with Ranzinger Bach)	34	198
174	Vils (including the Große Vils)	110	1,445
176	Große Ohe (with Geißa–…–Geißleitenbach)	46	176
178	Ilz	62	850
18	Inn	517	26,130
182	Mangfall (including the Weißach)	58	1,099
184	Alz (including the Tiroler Achen)	150	2,197
186	Salzach	225	6,700
188	Rott	109	1,205
1914	Große Mühl	71	560

=== 2 Rhine ===
Number	Name	Length [km]	Catchment area [km²]
2	Rhine	1239	185,300
215	Lake of Constance: Obersee		(GKZ: 215 – 217); 5,386
217	Lake of Constance: Untersee; also including the section of the Rhine down to its confluence with the Thur		(GKZ: 215 – 217); 5,386
2152	Argen with Obere Argen	73	655
2198	Wutach	91	1,140
232	Wiese	55	458
2338	Elz	121	1,539
234	Kinzig	93	1,406
236	Murg	80	466
238	Neckar	362	13,934
2382	Fils	63	699
2384	Enz (including Poppelbach and Great Enz)	106	2,229
2386	Kocher (including the Black Kocher)	169	1,960
2388	Jagst	190	1,838
24	Main (including the White Main)	572	27,292
242	Regnitz (including the Rednitz and Franconian Rezat)	187	7,523
2422	Pegnitz (including the Fichtenohe)	127	1,230
244	Franconian Saale	139	2,765
246	Tauber	129	1,810
248	Nidda	90	1,942
252	Selz	61	389
254	Nahe	125	4,067
256	Wisper	30	209
258	Lahn	246	5,925
26	Moselle	544	28,286
262	Sauer	173	4,259
264	Saar	235	7,431
2642	Blies	99	1,960
2646	Prims	91	737
2648	Nied (including the Nied Française)	114	1,370
266	Kyll	142	845
268	Alf	52	358
2716	Wied	102	771
2718	Ahr	85	897
272	Sieg	155	2,857
2736	Wupper	116.5	813
274	Erft	107	1,838
276	Ruhr	219	4,485
2772	Emscher	83	775
278	Lippe	220	4,888
28	Meuse (river totally outside Germany, basin partly in Germany)	874	33,000
282	Rur	165	2,361
284	Schwalm	35	268
286	Niers	118	1,381

=== 3 Ems ===
Here some three-figure numbers are not listed.

Number	Name	Length [km]	Catchment area [km²]
3	Ems	371	13,160
316	Hessel	39	213
318	Bever	39,5	217
32	Werse	67	762
332	Münstersche Aa	43	172
34	Große Aa	25	922
36	Hase	170	3,086
38	Leda (with Ohe u. Sagter Ems)	75	1.917
388	Jümme (with Barßeler Tief & Soeste)	94	450
394	Oldersumer Sieltief (with Fehntjer Tief (North) & western Flumm)	26	235
397	Dollard (as a section of Ems estuary)		
3974	Dollard (as a bay of Ems estuary)		
398	Knockster Tief (with Wiegoldsburer Riede)	31	1351
399	Outer mouth of Ems River		

=== 4 Weser ===
Number	Name	Length [km]	Catchment area [km²]
4	Weser (from confluence of Werra and Fulda)	451	41,094
41	Werra	300	4,497
412	Hasel	26	331
414	Ulster	57	421
416	Hörsel	55	784
418	Wehre	36	452
42	Fulda	221	6,947
422	Fliede	22	271
424	Schlitz (river) (including Altefeld, own GKZ 4241)	43	315
426	Haune	67	500
428	Eder	176	3,361
432	Schede	13	49
434	Nieme	17	40
436	Schwülme	29	290
438	Reiherbach	10.5	35
44	Diemel	111	1.762
442	Hoppecke	35	92
444	Twiste	41	447
446	Warme	33	157
448	Esse	28	192
452	Nethe	50	460
454	Lenne	24	125
456	Emmer	62	535
458	Exter	26	109
46	Werre	72	1,485
462	Bega	44	377
464	Aa (including Johannisbach)	44	377
466	Else	35	416
468	Rehmerloh-Mennighüffer Mühlenbach	16	71
472	Bückeburger Aue	39	173
474	Gehle	27	163
478	Steinhuder Meerbach	29	356
476	Große Aue	85	1,522
48	Aller	260	15,744
482	Oker	128	1,834
484	Fuhse	98	918
486	Örtze (including Aue & Wietze)	70	760
488	Leine	281	6,512
492	Ochtum (including Süstedter Bach)	45	917
494	Wümme	118	1.585
496	Hunte	189	2,785
498	Lune	43	383

=== 5 Elbe ===
Number	Name	Length [km]	Catchment area [km²]
5	Elbe	1094	148,268
52	Vltava (river totally in Czechia, basin partly in Germany)	430	28,090
5281	Mže	103	1,829
532	Ohře	316	5,614
538	Black Elster	179	5,705
54	Mulde (Zwickau + United Mulde)	314	7,400
541	Zwickau Mulde	167	2,352
542	Freiberg Mulde	124	2,981
549	Vereinigte Mulde (United Mulde)	147	7,400, own 2,067
56	Saale	413	23,719
562	Loquitz	34	364
564	Unstrut	192	6,364
566	White Elster	257	5,154
568	Bode	169	3,229
572	Nuthe	39	509
574	Ehle	40	?
576	Ohre	103	1.503
578	Tanger	33	480
58	Havel	334	23,858
582	Spree	400	10.100
584	Nuthe	52	1,935
586	Plane	57	639
588	Rhin	129	1,780
592	Elde	208	2,990
5934	Jeetzel	73	1.928
594	Ilmenau	107	2,852
5956	Alster	56	581
5958	Este	62	364
596	Lühe (including Aue)	44	216
5974	Stör	78	1.781
598	Oste	153	1,711

=== 6 Oder ===
Number	Name	Length [km]	Catchment area [km²]
6	Oder	866	118,861
674	Lusatian Neiße	254	4,297
696	Western Oder	17 (in Germany)	

=== 9 Coastal region ===
Number	Name	Length [km]	Catchment area [km²]
928	Issel	82	1,208
934	Western Ems		
94	Coastal seas between Borkum and Sahlenburg mudflat		
942	Jade Bight		
95	Coastal seas between Sahlenburg mudflat and the Danish Border		
952	Eider	188	3,275
96	Baltic Sea		
962	Trave	114	2,676
964	Warnow	155	3,324
9652	Recknitz	88	669
966	Peene	136	5,110
9664	Tollense	96	1,829
9666	Trebel	87	956
968	Uecker (upper section Ucker)	98	2,200

== Literature ==
- Landesamt für Wasser und Abfall Nordrhein-Westfalen (publ.): Gebietsbezeichnung und Verzeichnis der Gewässer in Nordrhein-Westfalen

== See also ==
- Waterbody index number – an overview
- Stream order, hydrological hierarchy of rivers and streams
