= Taubergießen =

Floodplain wetland on the Upper Rhine, Germany

Taubergießen is a floodplain wetland on the southern Upper Rhine in the natural area Offenburg Rhine plain. Taubergießen was declared Naturschutzgebiet (Nature Reserve) in 1979 and, with 1,697 hectares, is one of the largest protected areas in Baden-Württemberg. It has a north–south extension of more than 12 kilometres (7.5 mi). The largest width is about 2.5 kilometres (1.6 mi).

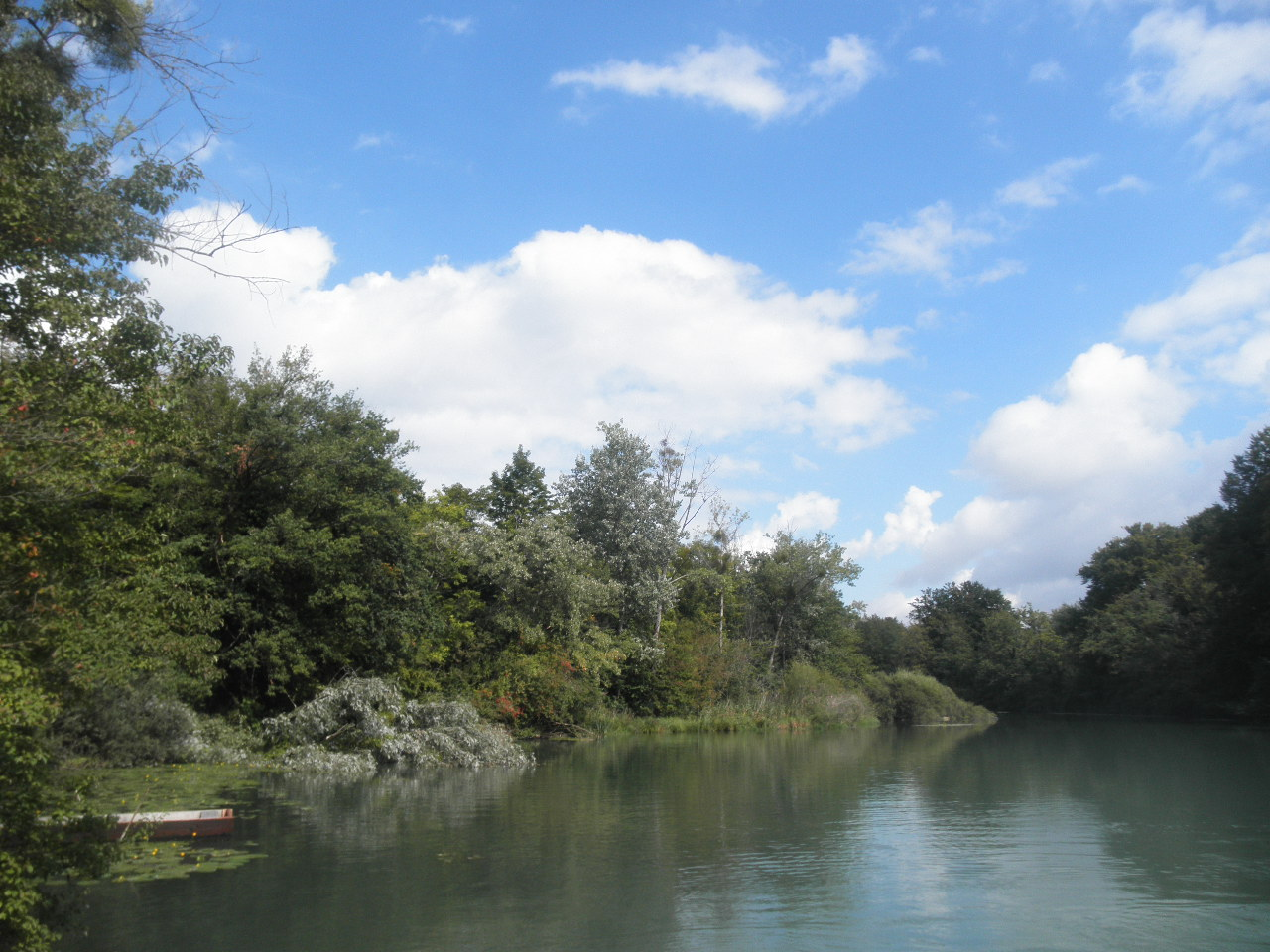
Nature Reserve Taubergießen

== Name ==
The name "Taubergießen" derives from Taubergießen, one of the numerous watercourses and branches of the nature reserve, which runs in the north of the area and drains from the right into the lower course of the Elz river, which is closer to the Rhine. Under "pouring" is understood underground, i.e. in direct connection with the groundwater flowing parts of the stream, which come from a sufficient depression of the bottom again to the surface. These are particularly common in this area, the middle area of the southern Upper Rhine. The word "deaf" describes nutrient-poor waters with low fish population.

== Geography ==
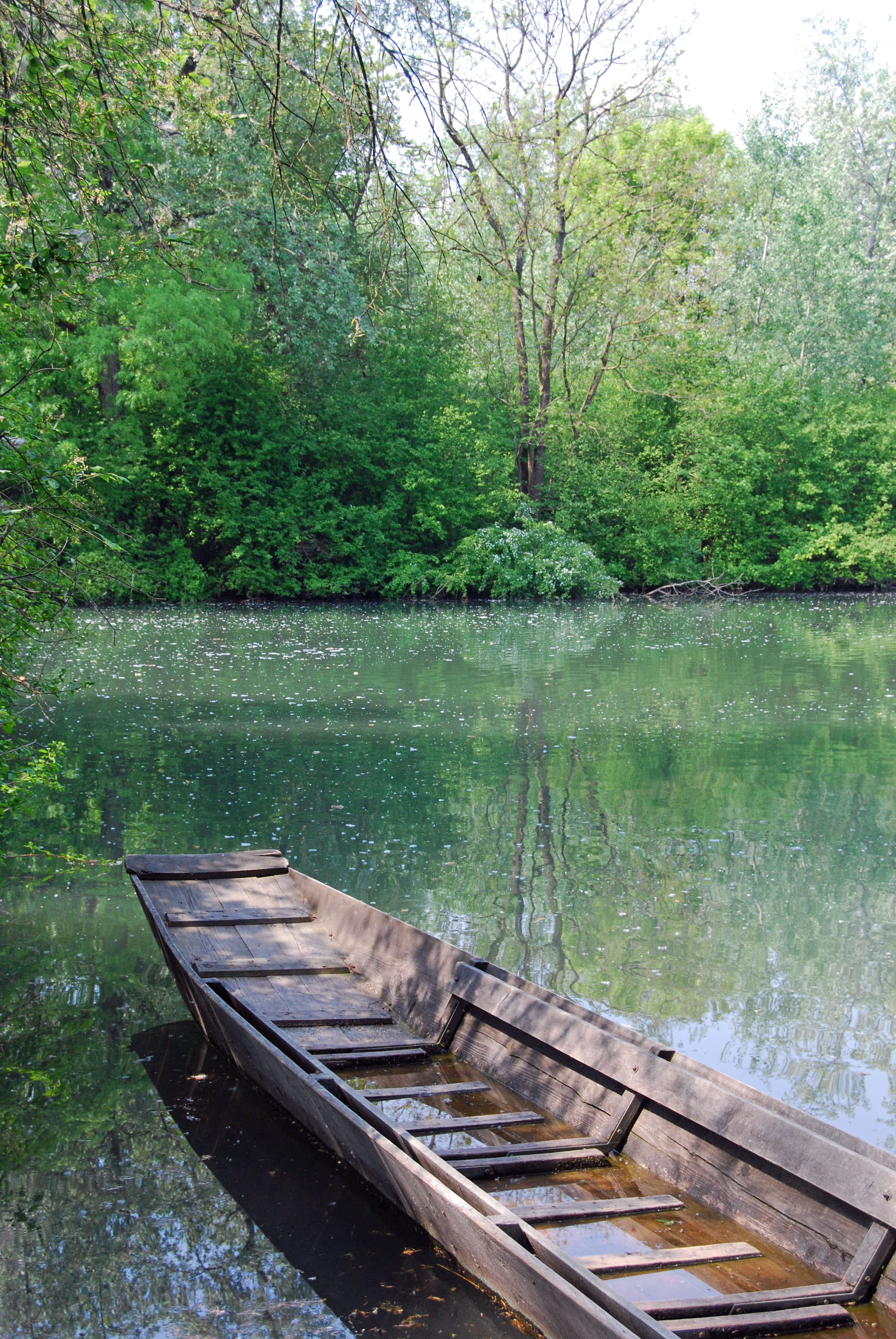
Taubergießen

Taubergießen is located in the southern Upper Rhine plain between Freiburg im Breisgau and Offenburg in the districts Emmendingen and Ortenau, near the northeastern town of Lahr and immediately west of the communities Kappel-Grafenhausen, Rust and Rheinhausen.

Taubergießen belongs predominantly to the district of the communities Kappel-Grafenhausen, Rust and Rheinhausen. 9.98 square kilometres (3.85 sq mi) property of the French community Rhinau are historically conditioned. On the German territory, Rheinau, this "piece of Alsace in Germany", is classified as unincorporated community. Due to the straightening of the Rhine in the first half of the 19th century and the first localization of a river main bed in the area, a change in the border between Germany and France was partially made. However, the changes in the course of the river bed (respectively beds - its arms) did not change ownership.

== Protected area ==
Specifications

The area was declared a nature reserve (NSG No. 3.108) on September 27, 1979, and was incorporated by legal ordinance from April 8, 1997, into the protected area number 3.233 by the regional council Freiburg. The nature reserve with an area of 1,697 hectares is classified in the International Union for Conservation of Nature (IUCN) category IV. The CDDA code of the World Database on Protected Areas (WDPA) is 165837.

== History ==
The Upper Rhine Plain is originated about 35 million years ago as a result of a rift. Between Basel and Frankfurt, the surface of the earth sank and the today surrounding Vosges and the Black Forest emerged. The Rhine found its way from the Alps to the North Sea. Later, floodplains developed here.

As part of the Revitalization of Taubergießen project from 2006 and the start of building activity in 2007, water channels were dug, passages built, bridges erected and older buildings redesigned. These measures prevent further siltation of the areas, in particular at low water, increasing the stream velocity and ensuring more frequent flow. In 2008, Taubergießen was included in the Ramsar Convention.

== Flora and fauna ==
Flora

About 60% of the area is forested, the rest is used as grassland for agriculture. The extensive landscape is crossed by numerous watercourses. Rare orchids blossom here.

Fauna

The nature reserve, with its forests, meadows, purple moor grass meadows, dry calcareous grassland and flood dams, is a habitat for many endangered species.

== Literature ==
- Dietmar Keil: Erlebte Wildnis Taubergiessen. 1. Auflage. Schillinger, Freiburg im Breisgau 1992, ISBN 3-921340-24-1.
- Werner A. Gallusser (Hrsg.): Die Auen am Oberrhein/Les Zones Alluviales du Rhin Supérieur - Ausmass und Perspektiven des Landschaftswandels am südlichen und mittleren Oberrhein seit 1800... Birkhäuser, Basel 1992, ISBN 3-7643-2805-3.
- H.-J. Truöl, E. Spiegelhalter: Altrhein: verlorenes Paradies. 1. Auflage. Schillinger, Freiburg im Breisgau 1984, ISBN 3-89155-001-4.
- E. Seeger (Hrsg.): Erlebnisregion Rheinauen - Grand Ried Radwanderkarte 1:60.000. 1. Auflage. E. Seeger Verlag, Freiburg im Breisgau 2011.
- Landesamt für Geoinformation und Landentwicklung Baden-Württemberg (Hrsg.): Offenburg Ortenau Kinzigtal Freizeitkarte 1:50.000. 2. Auflage. 2009, ISBN 978-3-89021-596-9.
- Thomas Kaiser: Naturerlebnis-Rheinauen. Von Basel zum Taubergiessen bis Straßburg. Schillinger, Freiburg im Breisgau 2008, ISBN 978-3-89155-341-1.
- Egon Kästel: Die Rheinauen-ein Naturparadies. Bilder einer artenreichen und schützenswerten Landschaft. Verlag für Regionalkultur, 2009, ISBN 978-3-89735-553-8.
