= Elz (Rhine) =

River in Germany

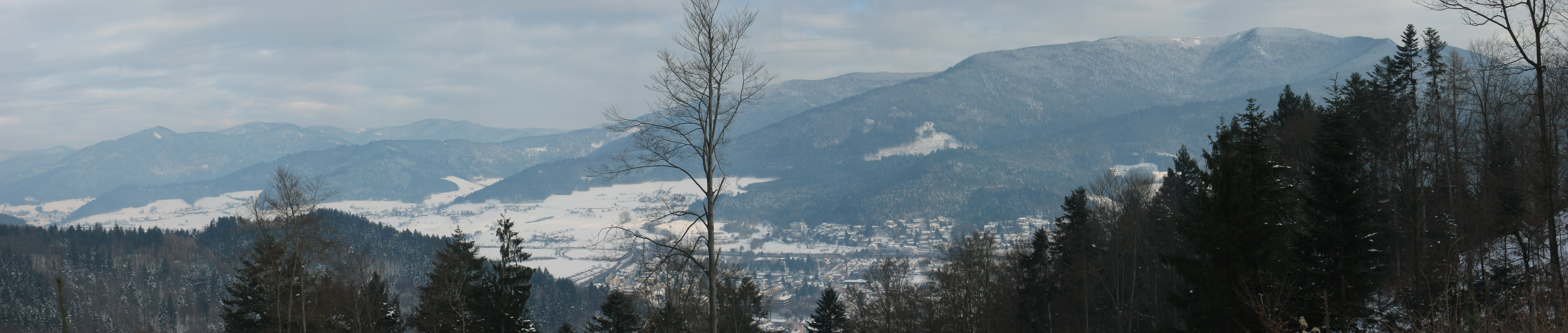
- View of the Hörnleberg, Obereck and Kandel (right) looking southeast over the middle Elz valley and Waldkirch

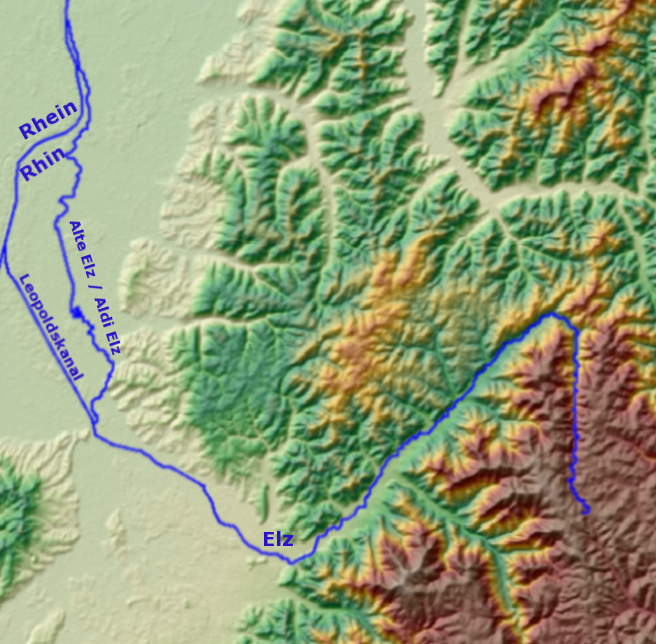
- Course of the Elz

Location
- Country: Germany
- State: Baden-Württemberg
- Reference no.: DE: 2338

Physical characteristics
- Source
  - elevation: 1,038 m above sea level (NHN)
- Mouth
  - elevation: 137 m above sea level (NHN)
- Length: 121.0 km (75.2 mi) (over the Old Elz)
- Basin size: 1,555 km^{2} (600 sq mi)

Basin features
- Progression: Rhine→ North Sea
- Landmarks: Large towns: Waldkirch, Emmendingen; Small towns: Elzach; Villages: Winden im Elztal, Gutach im Breisgau, Teningen, Riegel am Kaiserstuhl
- Tributaries
  - left: Wilde Gutach, Glotter/Lossele, Dreisam, Eichstetter Mühlbach
  - right: Biederbach, Brettenbach, Bleiche, Ettenbach

The Elz (German: [ˈɛlts]) is a river in Baden-Württemberg, Germany, a right tributary of the Rhine. It rises in the Black Forest, near the source of the Breg. The Elz flows through Elzach, Waldkirch and Emmendingen before reaching the Rhine near Lahr. Its length is approx. 121 km (75 mi).

The lower reaches of the Elz are by-passed by the Leopold Canal, a flood relief canal.

== Course ==
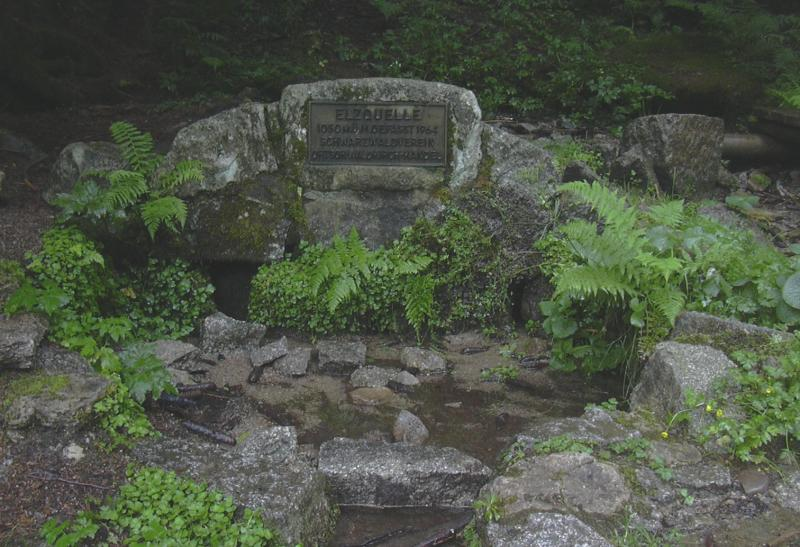
Source of the Elz

The Elz rises north of Furtwangen in the area of the Brend and the Rohrhardsberg mountains (between the Furtwänglehof and the Kolmenhof) not far from the source of the Breg which is hydrographically the source of the Danube.

In its upper reaches the Elz flows in a northerly direction, initially through a high valley with pasture land, bog and ice age glacial landforms. Then after a steep drop at the little Elz Falls, it continues through a deeply incised, wooded and sparsely populated V-shaped valley.

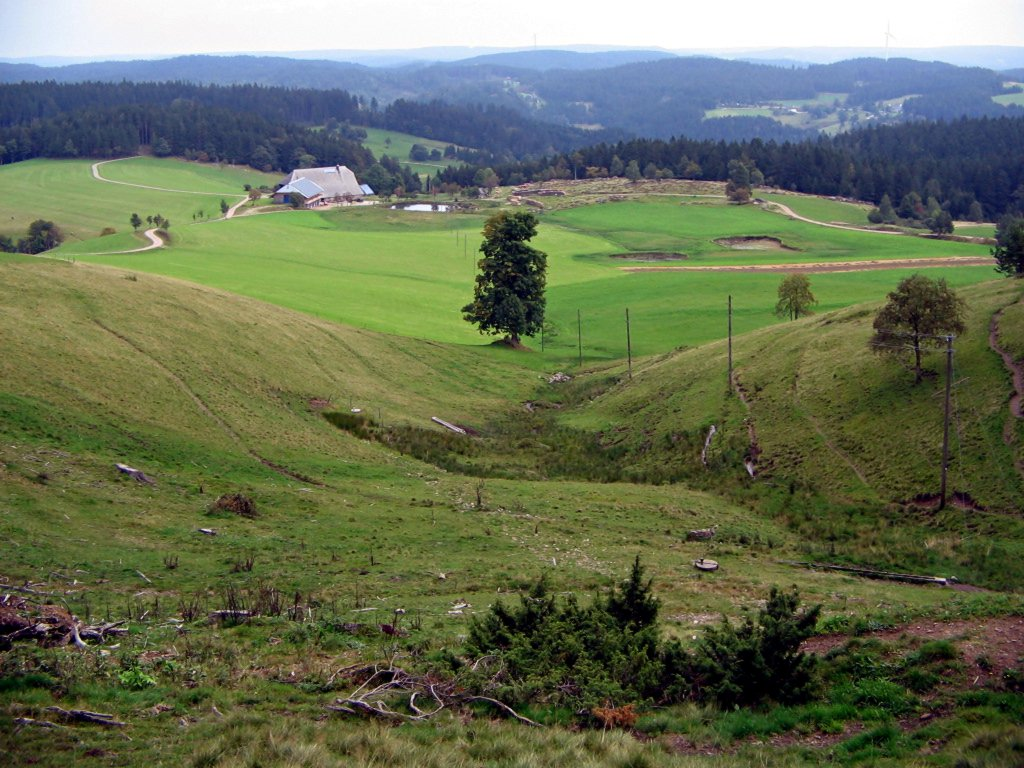
High valley above the V-shaped valley of the Elz (The Elzhofbächle on the Rohrhardsberg)

In the Oberprechtal valley it bends sharply towards the southwest. This is the start of the middle (actual) Elz valley, which runs in a straight line towards the southwest, separating the High Black Forest (700 to 900 m) to the southeast from the far lower parts of the Central Black Forest. In the now densely populated valley are the town of Elzach, the villages of Winden and Gutach im Breisgau, where the Elz receives the waters of the Wild Gutach, which is just under half its size. Below the town of Waldkirch the Elz enters the Upper Rhine Plain near Denzlingen in the Freiburg Bay. From now on it flows in a northwesterly direction, past Emmendingen and Teningen. Some of the water of the Elz is diverted into a millstream through Emmendingen, where it drives several hydropower stations and enhances the appearance of the town. Near Riegel on the Kaiserstuhl the Elz merges with the Dreisam from Freiburg im Breisgau and the Old Dreisam.

Soon thereafter the Elz forks again: a certain amount of water (up to 8.5 m^{3}/s) flows down the Old Elz (Alte Elz) through the Europapark Rust to its mouth on the Rhine. Other quantities of water, on average about 13.2 m^{3}/s, is fed along the Leopold Canal, built by Johann Gottfried Tulla, northwest of Rheinhausen into the Rhine. The Old Elz empties higher up, near Schwanau, into the Rhine. Today it is led down various Old Rhine channels parallel to the Rhine to the southern edge of Kehl, a distance of 121 kilometres from the source; formerly it was over 90 kilometres long.

== Tributaries ==
The table shows all tributaries that are longer than 5 kilometres, with the exception of millstreams alongside rivers. Based on the waterbody number (Fließgewässerkennziffer), the Frischnaubach is the highest tributary - it discharges into the Elz in the parish of Prechtal. The Ettenbach is the lowest tributary and empties into the Elz just before Grafenhausen. All tributaries have their catchment areas in the county of Emmendingen, with the exception of the Ettenbach, which flows through in Ortenaukreis.

Tributaries of the Elz
Distance from mouth (km)	GKZ (Note: Official German waterbody number. A dash has been added after "2338" (the ID for the Elz itself) for readability.)	Name	Side	Discharges into (Note: The name of the Elz at the tributary mouth.)	Length (km) (Note: Length based on the Gewässernetz layer (AWGN) of the online map server of the LUBW. The length may include upper reaches with a different name and the name of upper reaches may transition from hydrologically dominating tributaries to become the name run.)	Catchment (km^{2}) (Note: Catchment area from the Basiseinzugsgebiet (AWGN) layer of the online map server of the LUBW, in some cases calculated from the sub of subareas.)	Mouth location	Mouth elevation (Note: Height from the contour map on the map background layer Topographische Karte or text entries from Map services of the Baden-Württemberg State Office for the Environment, Survey and Conservation (Landesanstalt für Umwelt, Messungen und Naturschutz Baden-Württemberg). This entry has an error margin, which may be caused by interpolation errors or because the height difference between the river height and terrain height cannot be determined from the map.) (m above NN)	Remarks
98.912	2338-12	Frischnaubach	right	Elz	5.7	11.6	Elzach-Eilet	477.8	
95.745	2338-194	Yachbach	left	Elz	7.8	19.5	Elzach, sewage works	343	
95.434	2338-2	Biederbach	right	Elz	10.3	31.8	Elzach, Ortsende	340	
91.997	2338-32	Spitzenbach	right	Elz	6.4	11.0	Winden im Elztal-Niederwinden	317	
87.349	2338-392	Siegelbach	right	Elz	6.4	13.4	Gutach im Breisgau-Stollen	289.0	
86.934	2338-4	Wilde Gutach	left	Elz	25.2	129.9	Gutach im Breisgau	287	
85.966	2338-512	Talbach	left	Elz	6.2	9.1	Gutach im Breisgau	281	
83.477	2338-53126	Altersbach	left	Elz	6.6	6.7	Waldkirch	266	
80.463	2338-532	Dettenbach	left	Elz	6.2	9.8	Waldkirch, Ortsende	247	
77.985	2338-54	Lossele	left	Elz	20.1	49.8	Denzlingen	236.8	right and main lower reaches of the Glotter
70.420	2338-6	Brettenbach	right	Elz	24.2	71.2	Emmendingen	192	
63.341	2338-8	Dreisam	left	Elz	48.8	339.7	Riegel am Kaiserstuhl	178	Catchment area excludes the Old Dreisam
18	2338-894	Old Dreisam (Alte Dreisam)	left	Dreisam	38.2	258.8	Riegel am Kaiserstuhl	178	is the left Dreisam tributary at its mouth
62.817	2338-9112	Wihlbach	left	Elz	5.0	4.9	Riegel am Kaiserstuhl	177	
60.077	2338-912	Malterdinger Dorfbach	right	Old Elz (Alte Elz)	6.6	15.8	Kenzingen-Hecklingen	177	
57.108	2338-914	Little Elz (Kleine Elz)	right	Old Elz	6.6	8.5	Kenzingen	176	
50.119	2338-92	Bleichbach	right	Old Elz	18.4	60.8	Herbolzheim, Mühlehof	170	
47.273	2338-932	Grundelbach	right	Old Elz	5.6	6.8	Rust	165	
42.231	2338-94	Ettenbach	right	Old Elz	18.4	59.9	Kappel-Grafenhausen-Kappel am Rhein	161	
38.466	2338-954	Taubergießen	left	Old Elz	8.9	8.7	Kappel, sewage works	157	begins as left tailstream of the Old Elz near Rust
38.038	2338-96	Kapuzinerbach	right	Old Elz	14.3	24.4	Kappel, sewage works	157	
36.831	2338-98	(Old Rhine channel)	left	Old Elz	43.2	134.2	Schwanau-Wittenweier	156	right old channel of the Rhine
24.316	2338-992	Ottenheimer Mühlbach	right	Raukehle/Mühlbach	9.7	13.8	Schwanau-Ottenheim	150	begins as the right tailstream at Schwanau-Wittenweier

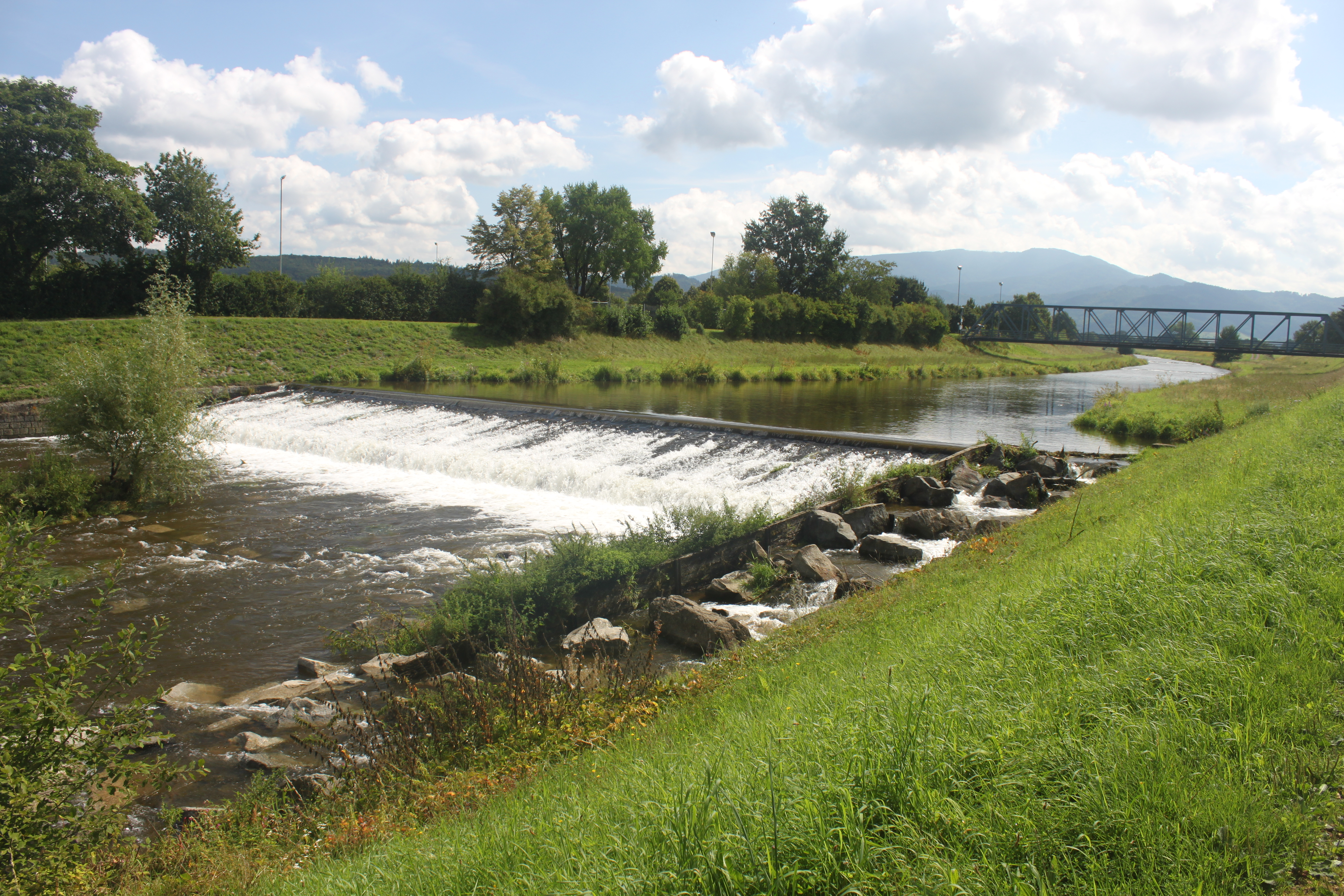
Wassermer Wehr at the canalised Elz south of Emmendingen

== Fauna ==
Commonly found species of fish in the Elz are the:

- Barbel
- Chub
- Dace
- Riffle minnow
- Common minnow
- River trout
- Grayling
- Eel
- Pike
- Roach
- Rudd

== Gallery ==
Aerial photographs

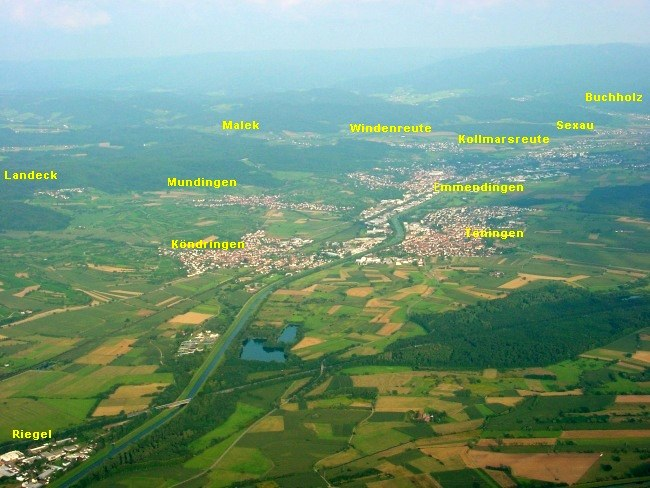
View upriver via Emmendingen to the Kandel

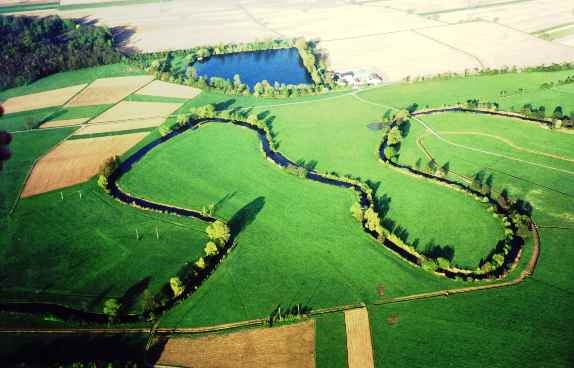
The "Old Elz" between Kenzingen and Rheinhausen (Breisgau)

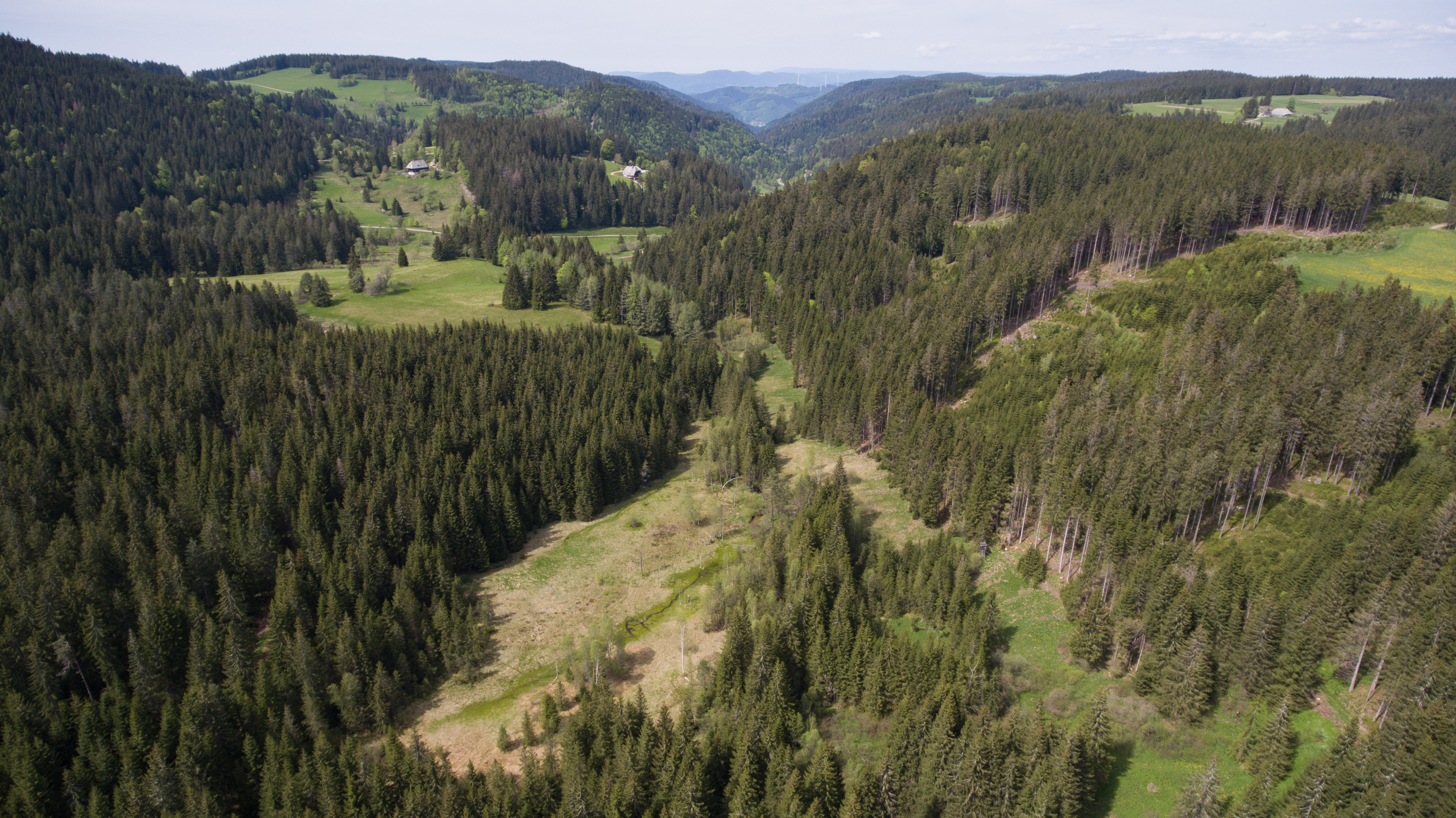
Upper Elz, looking north
