= Weisweil (Emmendingen) =

- Municipality
- Coat of arms

- Location of Weisweil within Emmendingen district
- Interactive map of Weisweil
- Location within Germany Location within Baden-Württemberg
- Coordinates: 48°12′01″N 07°40′35″E
- Country: Germany
- State: Baden-Württemberg
- Admin. region: Freiburg
- District: Emmendingen

Government
  - Mayor (2021–29): Michael Baumann

Area
  - Total: 19.09 km^{2} (7.37 sq mi)
- Elevation: 174 m (571 ft)

Population (2025-12-31)
  - Total: 2,217
  - Density: 116.1/km^{2} (300.8/sq mi)
- Time zone: UTC+01:00 (CET)
  - Summer (DST): UTC+02:00 (CEST)
- Postal codes: 79367
- Dialling codes: 07646
- Vehicle registration: EM
- Website: www.weisweil.de

Weisweil is a municipality in the district of Emmendingen in Baden-Württemberg in Germany.

== Location ==
Weisweil is located several kilometres north of the Kaiserstuhl low mountain range and about 18 kilometres northwest of the local town Emmendingen In the Upper Rhine Valley. The Rhine forests and meadows of the Weisweil district became a protected area in 1998 to preserve the floodplains due to the diversity of species found there. Thus forming the Whyl-Weisweil Nature Reserve. The reserve extends in the north to the Leopold Canal and borders the Taubergießen Nature Reserve.

The nearby Grand Canal d'Alsace which branches off at Weisweil on the French side of the Rhine river along with the construction of a Rhine water power plant created a barrage through which the main arm of the Rhine expands to a width of around 600 meters. A popular water sports area with a marina has developed here.

=== Neighbouring Municipalities ===
The municipalities of Rheinhausen, Kenzingen, Forchheim and Wyhl (located clockwise from north to south) border Weisweil. All located in the district of Emmendingen. To the west, the municipality borders on the Rhine, across from which is the border to France.

== Politics ==
The local election on 25 May 2014 produced a voter turnout of 63.24%

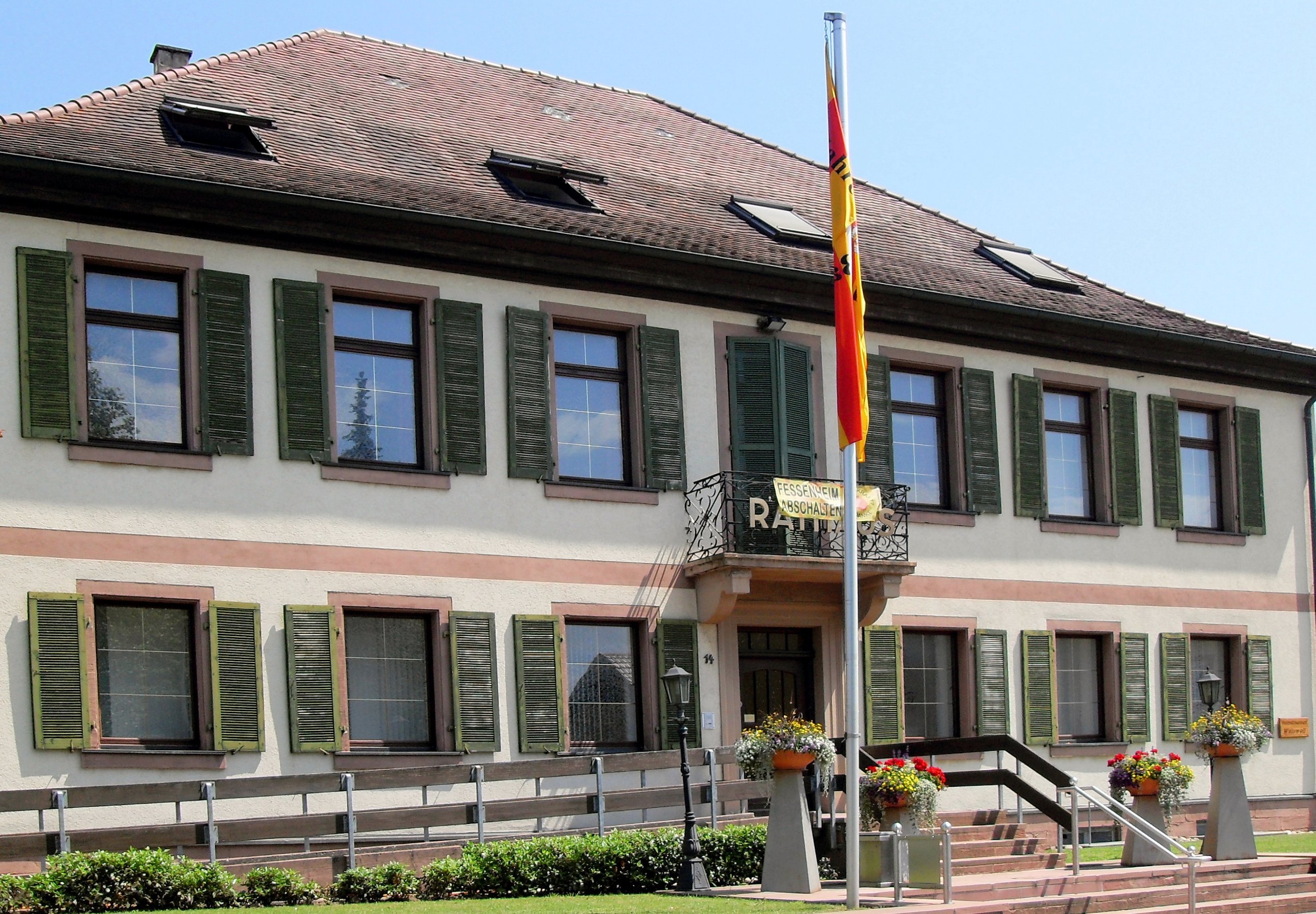
Townhall of Weisweil

=== Government Figures ===
The Bürgermeister (Mayor) Michael Baumann has been in office since January 2014, following the election in November 2013.

=== Administrative Group ===
Weisweil together with the neighbouring municipality of Rheinhausen and the towns of Herbolzheim and Kenzingen, form the municipal administration association "Kenzingen-Herbolzheim" based in Kenzingen.

== Economy and Infrastructure ==
=== Residing Companies ===
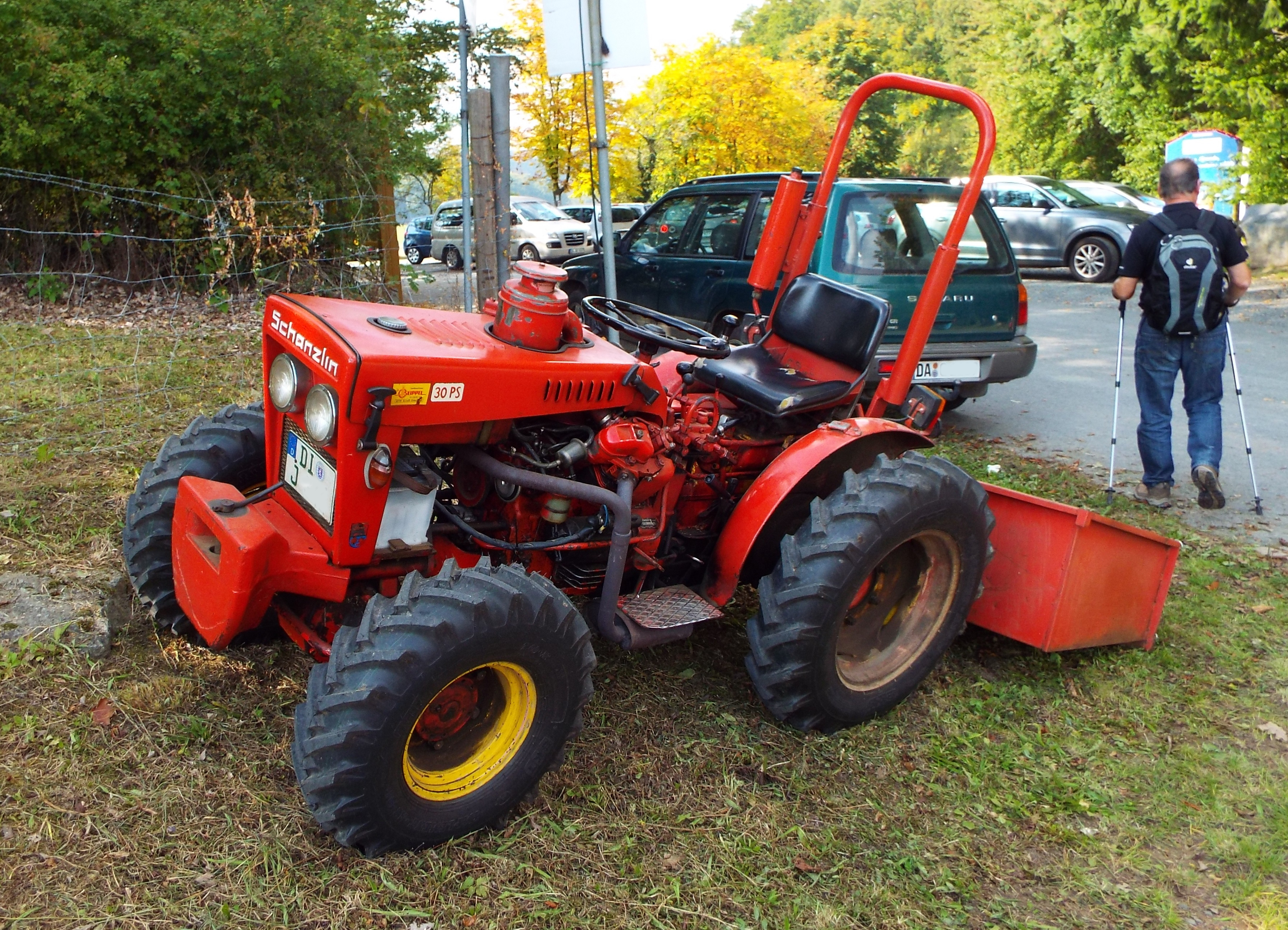
- A Schanzlin 4-wheeled tractor
  In 1908 the Horst Schanzlin founded the Schanzlin company in Fahrnau, Baden Württemberg. It was originally a small mechanical workshop producing pumps, bandsaws, straw cutters, hand tractors, and parts for gear manufacturing. Beginning in 1948 the company then known as Schanzlin Antriebstechnik GmbH. In 1953 the company relocated to Weisweil. The company purchased 30,000 square-meters of land for its use at Kopfle 30 Weisweil, 79367 Germany, with 8,000 of those being built onto. At times, up to 100 employees worked at the plant. The company then known as Schanzlin Maschinenfabrik and Schanzlin Antriebstechnik remained there until its closure on 1 December 2016.
- On 6 August 1956, the Bachert company began manufacturing fire engines and other fire protective equipment in Weisweil. After Bachert's closure in December 1988 the plant continued as Iveco Magirus Brandschutztechnik GmbH. Along with its factories in Ulm and Görlitz the plant continued to build fire devices within the Eurofire group. The companies production facilities remained active in Weisweil, Görlitz, Chambéry, and Kainbach until 2012, when the company restructured in favor of a central fire protection center in Ulm that produced an estimated 500 additional jobs. Until its closure the Weisweil location employed 185 people.

== Public Institutions ==
=== Local Services ===
Weisweil has a volunteer fire department, which on 9 June 2007 participated in a skit on the German television show "Verstehen Sie Spaß?". Additionally the town has a youth club referred to as JuWe. JuWe is described as a place where young people can meet and spend their free time together.

=== Educational Institutions ===
The town of Weisweil has a Grundschule (primary school). However, the towns Hauptschule (secondary school) has been closed.

== Notable people ==
=== Members of the Community ===
- Eduard Kaiser (1813-1903) - doctor and political, member of the state government.
- 5 January 1842 Carl Engler, † 7 February 1925 in Karlsruhe - chemist
- 1844, Friedrich Karl Oehler, † March 12, 1910 in Karlsruhe - Protestant theologian and prelate of the Evangelical Church in Baden
- 4 November 1959 Dieter Ehret - civil engineer, politician (former FDP member), member of the state parliament of Baden Württemberg from 2006 to 2011.

=== People with connections to Weisweil ===
- Karl Nicola (* 1939), from 1972 to 1992 SPD member of the state parliament of Baden-Württemberg, was mayor of Weisweil from 1974 to 1998.
