= Rheinhausen (disambiguation) =

Rheinhausen can refer to several towns in Germany:

- Rheinhausen, a district of the city of Duisburg
- Oberhausen-Rheinhausen, near Karlsruhe, Baden-Wurttemberg
- Rheinhausen (Breisgau), in southwestern Baden-Wurttemberg
