= Heusiepen =

River in Germany

Location
- Country: Germany
- States: North Rhine-Westphalia

Physical characteristics
- Mouth: Saalbach
  - location: 51.2143°N 7.1758°E

Basin features
- Progression: Saalbach→ Gelpe→ Morsbach→ Wupper→ Rhine→ North Sea

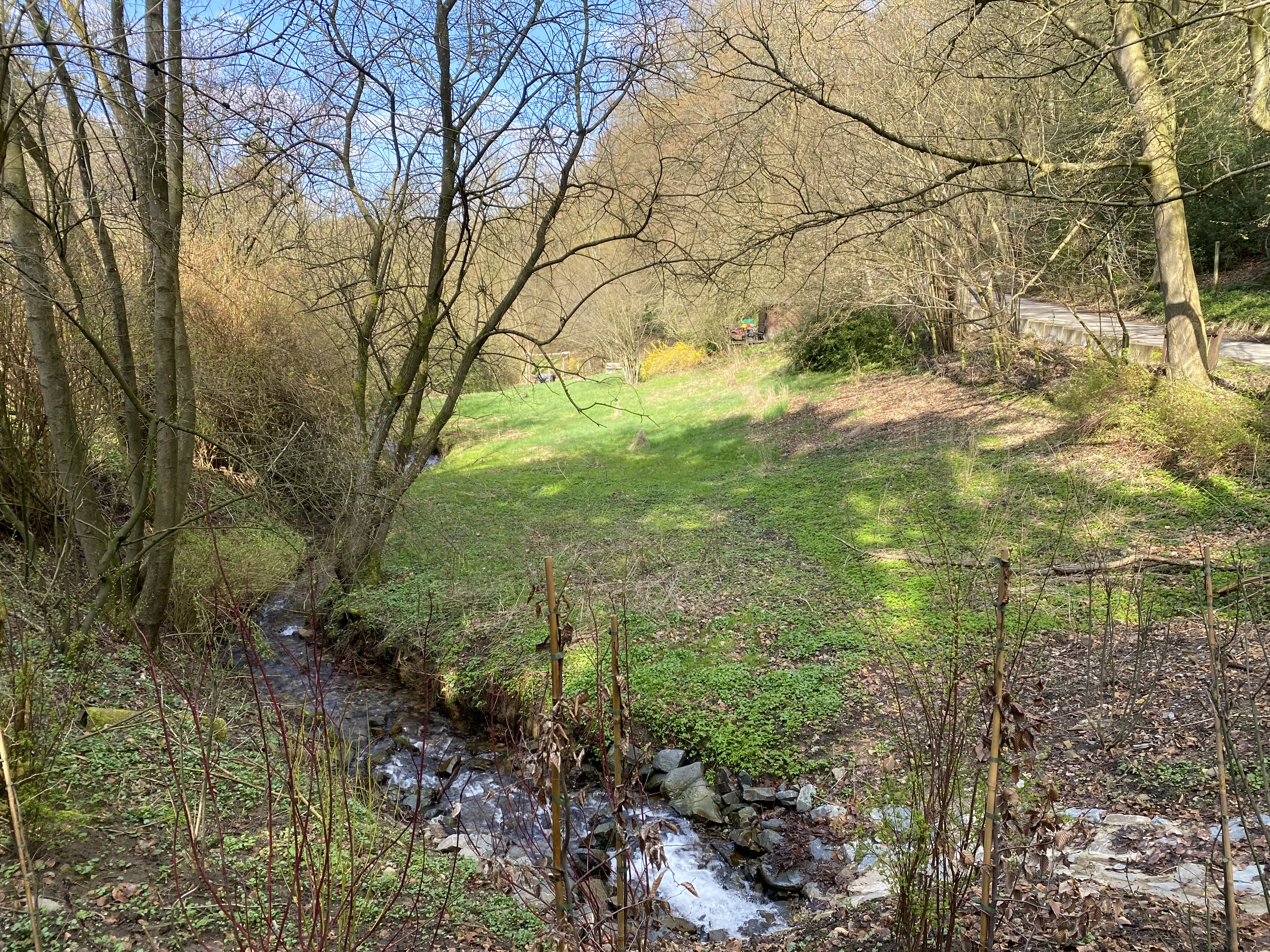

Heusiepen is a small river of North Rhine-Westphalia, Germany. It is 1.3 km long and a tributary of the Saalbach.

== See also ==
- List of rivers of North Rhine-Westphalia
