= Leopold Canal =

Leopold Canal (Dutch: Leopoldkanaal; French: Canal Léopold; German: Leopoldskanal) may refer to:

- Leopold Canal (Belgium)
- Leopold Canal (Baden-Württemberg), Germany
