= Saalbach =

Saalbach may refer to:

- Saalbach-Hinterglemm, an Austrian municipality
- Saalbach (Rhine), of Baden-Württemberg, Germany, tributary of the Rhine
- Saalbach (Gelpe), a river of North Rhine-Westphalia, Germany, tributary of the Gelpe

== People with the surname ==
- Astrid Saalbach (born 1955), Danish playwright and novelist
