= Rust, Baden-Württemberg =

Rust
- Municipality
- Flag Coat of arms

- Location of Rust within Ortenaukreis district
- Interactive map of Rust
- Location within Germany Location within Baden-Württemberg
- Coordinates: 48°16′06″N 07°43′40″E
- Country: Germany
- State: Baden-Württemberg
- Admin. region: Freiburg
- District: Ortenaukreis

Government
  - Mayor (2022–30): Kai-Achim Klare (SPD)

Area
  - Total: 13.27 km^{2} (5.12 sq mi)
- Elevation: 169 m (554 ft)

Population (2025-12-31)
  - Total: 4,874
  - Density: 367.3/km^{2} (951.3/sq mi)
- Time zone: UTC+01:00 (CET)
  - Summer (DST): UTC+02:00 (CEST)
- Postal codes: 77977
- Dialling codes: 07822
- Vehicle registration: OG, BH, KEL, LR, WOL
- Website: www.rust.de

Rust (German: [ʁʊst], locally [ʁuːst]; Low Alemannic: Ruäscht) is a municipality in the district of Ortenau in Baden-Württemberg in Germany. It is also the home of the famous theme park Europa-Park. The Renaissance era Balthasar Castle is now part of the theme park. The protected floodplain forest Taubergießen is adjacent to Rust.

== Geography ==
Rust is located between the Black Forest and the Vosges where the Elz River merges with the Upper Rhine River Plains from the southeast. The Elz enters the city from the south and runs in a northwesterly direction first through the village and borders the Europa-Park, Germany's largest amusement park.

=== Neighbouring communities ===
The following villages are sharing border with Rust. They are listed clockwise starting from the north: Kappel-Grafenhausen, Ringsheim, Rheinhausen. In the east the border is the river Rhine and the village of Rhinau (France). The next town is Lahr (17 km northwest).

=== Historical geography ===
Within the municipality of Rust are the lost towns of Rohrburg, which is indicated by a field name south of Rust, and Tannenbuck, which was identified through archaeological excavations as a high medieval tower hill.

=== Climate ===
The climate has mild differences between highs and lows, and there is adequate rainfall year-round. The Köppen Climate Classification subtype for this climate is "Cfb" (Marine West Coast Climate/Oceanic climate). However, it is close to being "humid subtropical climate" due to the mean temperatures in July and August just under 22 °C.

Climate data for Rust (CFB Lahr) 2015–2020 averages and extremes
| Month | Jan | Feb | Mar | Apr | May | Jun | Jul | Aug | Sep | Oct | Nov | Dec | Year |
|---|---|---|---|---|---|---|---|---|---|---|---|---|---|
| Record high °C (°F) | 15.7 (60.3) | 20.5 (68.9) | 24.4 (75.9) | 29.8 (85.6) | 32.8 (91.0) | 37.0 (98.6) | 38.4 (101.1) | 39.5 (103.1) | 32.2 (90.0) | 27.7 (81.9) | 23.0 (73.4) | 16.9 (62.4) | 39.5 (103.1) |
| Mean daily maximum °C (°F) | 6.1 (43.0) | 7.8 (46.0) | 12.5 (54.5) | 17.0 (62.6) | 20.7 (69.3) | 25.2 (77.4) | 28.0 (82.4) | 27.2 (81.0) | 22.5 (72.5) | 16.3 (61.3) | 10.5 (50.9) | 7.6 (45.7) | 16.8 (62.2) |
| Daily mean °C (°F) | 3.1 (37.6) | 3.7 (38.7) | 7.3 (45.1) | 11.0 (51.8) | 15.1 (59.2) | 19.5 (67.1) | 21.7 (71.1) | 20.5 (68.9) | 16.0 (60.8) | 11.1 (52.0) | 6.8 (44.2) | 4.5 (40.1) | 11.65 (52.97) |
| Mean daily minimum °C (°F) | −0.3 (31.5) | −0.4 (31.3) | 2 (36) | 4.7 (40.5) | 9.3 (48.7) | 13.5 (56.3) | 15.0 (59.0) | 14.1 (57.4) | 10.0 (50.0) | 6.3 (43.3) | 2.8 (37.0) | 1.1 (34.0) | 6.5 (43.7) |
| Record low °C (°F) | −11.8 (10.8) | −12.6 (9.3) | −4.9 (23.2) | −2.8 (27.0) | 1.1 (34.0) | 6.1 (43.0) | 6.4 (43.5) | 6.5 (43.7) | 1.2 (34.2) | −2.1 (28.2) | −7.2 (19.0) | −6.7 (19.9) | −12.6 (9.3) |
| Average precipitation mm (inches) | 60 (2.4) | 40 (1.6) | 42 (1.7) | 66 (2.6) | 108 (4.3) | 69 (2.7) | 58 (2.3) | 49 (1.9) | 45 (1.8) | 44 (1.7) | 49 (1.9) | 46 (1.8) | 676 (26.6) |
| Average rainy days (≥ 0.2 mm) | 18 | 13 | 13 | 14 | 15 | 13 | 12 | 11 | 10 | 11 | 14 | 16 | 160 |
| Average snowy days (≥ 0.2 cm) | 4 | 3 | 2 | 1 | 0 | 0 | 0 | 0 | 0 | 0 | 1 | 4 | 15 |
| Average relative humidity (%) | 87 | 84 | 77 | 72 | 73 | 73 | 73 | 76 | 80 | 86 | 85 | 87 | 79 |
| Mean monthly sunshine hours | 53 | 95 | 152 | 193 | 216 | 244 | 274 | 244 | 196 | 109 | 63 | 56 | 1,895 |
Source: Wetterdienst

== History ==
The town of Rust was first mentioned in the so-called Eddo-Testament in 762. The municipality belonged to the district of Lahr and, after its dissolution in 1973, it became part of the newly formed Ortenaukreis.

During the November pogrom in 1938, the interior of the synagogue was desecrated by SA forces, the building itself, however, was not destroyed. It was only demolished in 1964 after heated public debates. The memorial plaque attached to the Raiffeisenbank falsely claims the building was destroyed "due to the effects of war".

In 2001 the start of the first stage of the Tour de Suisse took place in Rust.

== Population ==
=== Population development ===
Source: Statistisches Landesamt Baden-Württemberg

| Year | Population |
|---|---|
| 1961 | 2,200 |
| 1965 | 2,475 |
| 1970 | 2,599 |
| 1975 | 2,595 |
| 1980 | 2,632 |
| 1985 | 2,653 |
| 1990 | 2,751 |
| 1995 | 3,122 |
| 2000 | 3,391 |
| 2005 | 3,586 |
| 2010 | 3,736 |
| 2015 | 4,003 |
| 2020 | 4,317 |
| 2022 | 5,002 |

=== Religion ===
Rust's population is 48% Roman Catholic, while 12% belong to the Protestant Church. 40% of the population belong to another Christian denomination or religion or are non-denominational. (Source: Zensus 2022)

== Politics ==
=== Administration ===
The municipality Rust is part of the administrative community of Ettenheim.

=== Municipal Council ===
The municipal council in Rust has 12 members. The local elections on May 25, 2019, with a voter turnout of 57.5% produced the following result:

| Parties and voter communities | | % 2019 | Seats 2019 | % 2014 | Seats 2014 | % 2009 | Seats 2009 |
| CDU | Christlich Demokratische Union Deutschlands | 29.1 | 3 | 28.4 | 3 | 35.2 | 4 |
| FWV | Freie Wählervereinigung | 24.0 | 3 | 25.0 | 3 | 21.3 | 3 |
| SPD | Sozialdemokratische Partei Deutschlands | 24.6 | 3 | 25.4 | 3 | 25.5 | 3 |
| ABfR | Aktive Bürger für Rust | 22.4 | 3 | 21.2 | 3 | 17.9 | 2 |
| total | | 100.0 | 12 | 100.0 | 12 | 100.0 | 12 |
| Voter turnout | | 57.5% | | 52.1% | | 52.4% | |

=== Mayor ===
On February 2, 2014, Kai-Achim Klare (SPD) won the election against Marcel Baumann by 78 votes in the second round of voting. He took over office of mayor from Günter Gorecky (SPD) on April 2, 2014. Gorecky has held the office since 1990. On January 16, 2022, Klare was re-elected for a second term in the first round of voting with 96.7% of all votes.

| Mayor | From | To |
|---|---|---|
| Kai-Achim Klare | 2014 | Today |
| Günter Gorecky | 1990 | 2014 |
| Wolfgang Obert | 1989 | 1989 |
| Erich Spoth | 1961 | 1989 |
| Theodor Schießle | 1948 | 1960 |
| Franz Utz | 1945 | 1948 |
| Emil Schießle | 1935 | 1945 |
| Karl Sattler | 1923 | 1935 |
| Wilhelm Utz | 1898 | 1923 |
| Wilhelm Schießle | 1890 | 1898 |
| Adam Sattler | 1889 | 1890 |
| Leopold Haas | 1885 | 1889 |
| Eduard Werner | 1879 | 1885 |
| Christian Gruninger | 1874 | 1879 |
| Berthold Schmidt | 1871 | 1874 |
| Heinrich Nadler | 1866 | 1871 |
Source: Ortssippenbuch Rust

=== Coat of arms ===

==== Coat of arms description ====
On the split shield on the left on blue background there is a silver fish placed palewise, turned left, on the right on red background, there is a golden plowshare.

==== Creation of the coat of arms with background information ====
From 1442 until 1806 Rust was owned by the family Böcklin von Böcklinsau, who was enrolled in the Ortenau Imperial Knighthood. Along with agriculture, fishing was once the primary source of income for the community. Fishermen in Rust were organised in a guild whose seal shows and anchor surrounded by two fish swimming downward. It is therefore not surprising that, since the oldest typographical document dated 1703, the community's seals have included a split shield with the coat of arms motifs that are still common today. Until the end of the 19th century, the plowshare was depicted fallen and the shield provided with an upper coat of arms (spangenhelm, mantling, and crown) – a peculiarity that can also be observed in other knightly places. The current version and tinging of the community's coat of arms goes back to a proposal from the General State Archives in 1898.

=== Twin towns ===
Rust (Baden) is twinned with the following town:

- France: Marlenheim, Alsace

== Culture and sights ==
=== Historical buildings ===
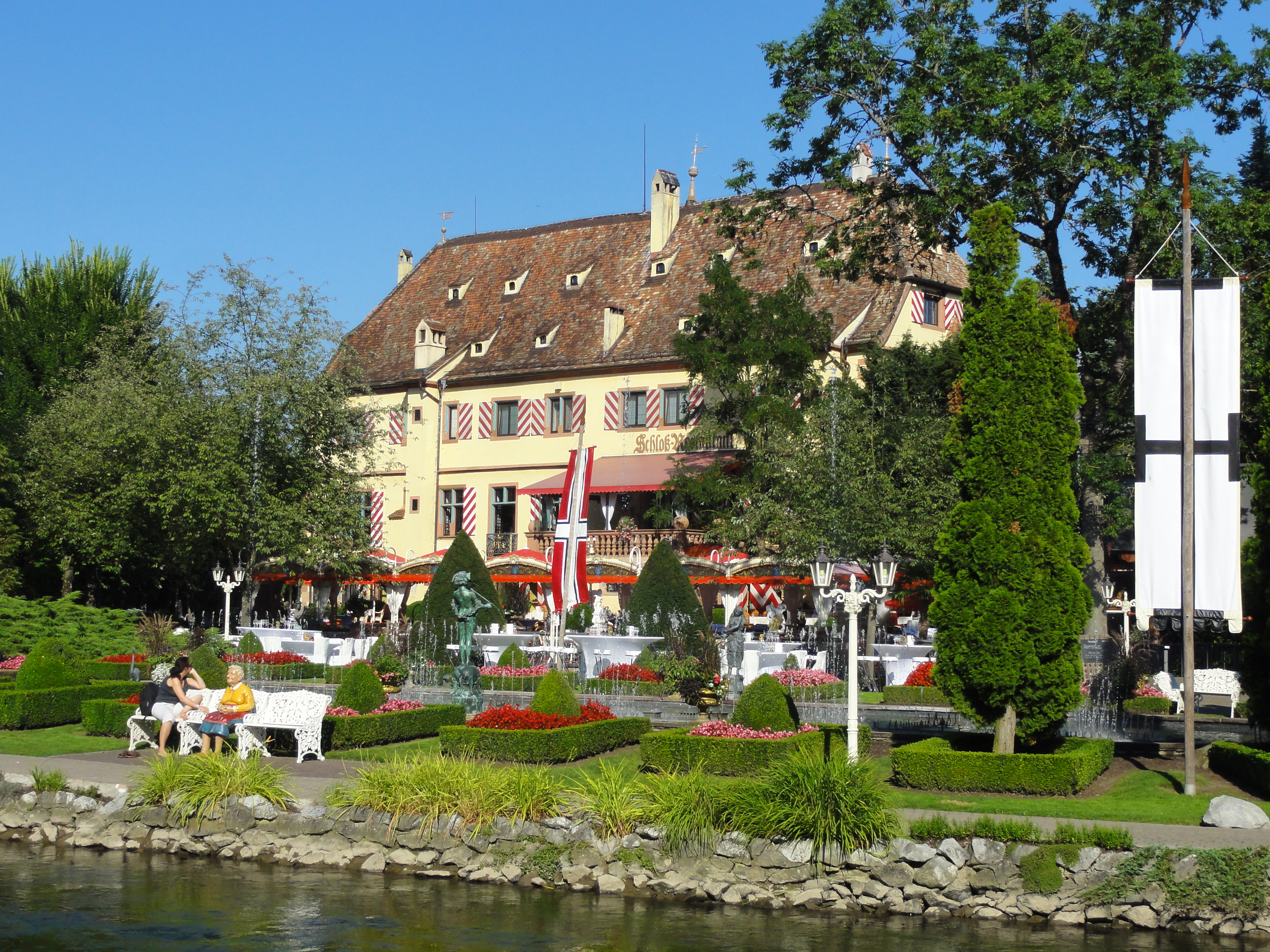
Schloss Balthasar in the Europa-Park in Rust, today

==== Schloss Balthasar ====
In the center of Rust is Balthasar Castle, which was built in 1442 and formerly inhabited by the noble Böcklin von Böcklinsau family. The castle can be viewed in Europa-Park and one of the theme parks restaurants is located in the castle.

==== Balzare-Schlösschen ====
The Balzare Schlösschen is also associated with the family Böcklin von Böcklinsau. The manor house dates from the early Renaissance and likely was built in 1598. Since the building is still inhabited today, it can only be viewed from the outside. The beautiful ornamentation in the timbered structure contrasts with the relatively simple construction. The castle is located on Ritterstrasse, not far from the church.

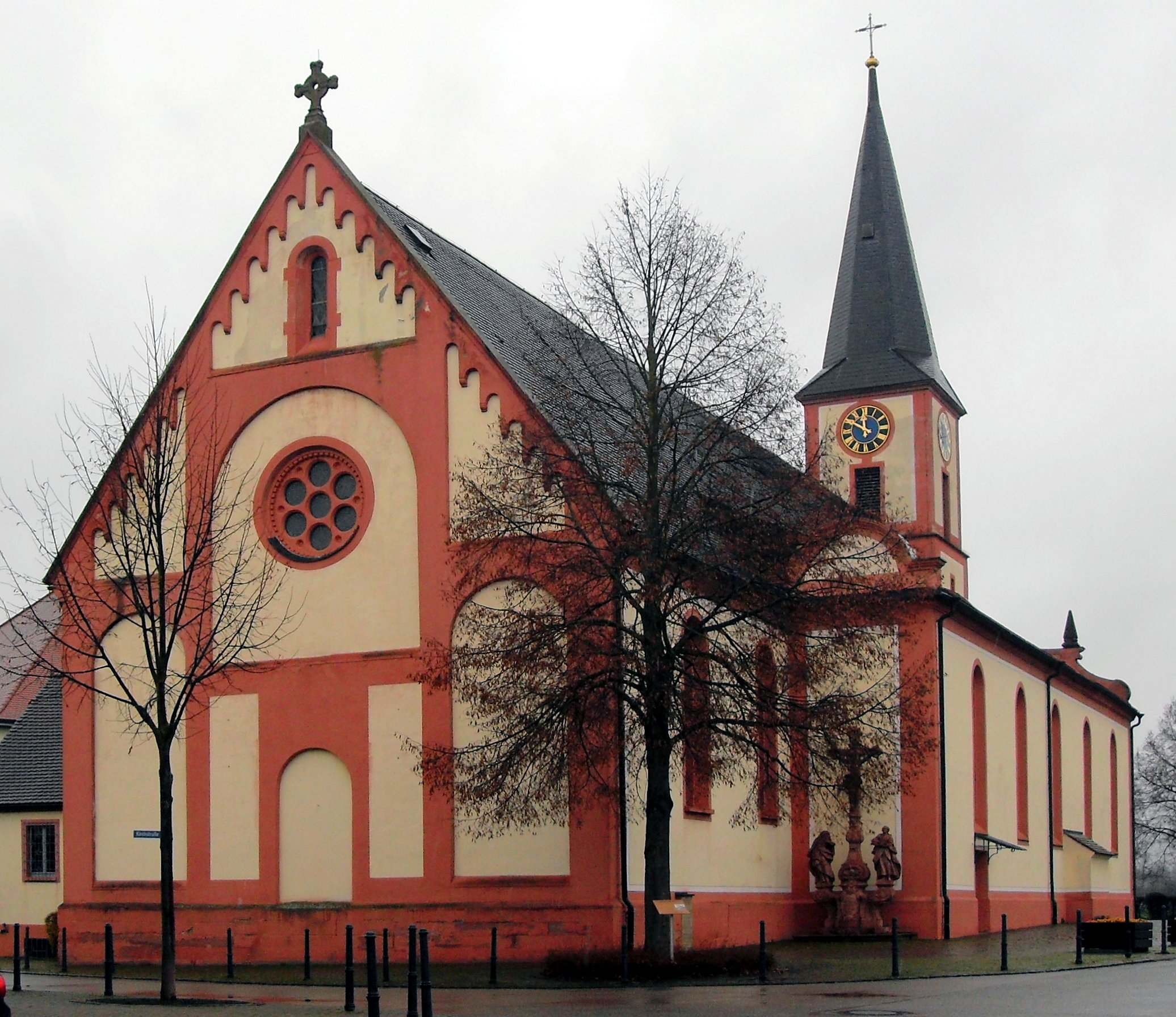
Parish Church of Petri in Ketten

==== Church ====
The Catholic church Petri in Ketten (Saint Peter in Chains) is the only parish church in Rust. It is also one of the few churches in the area dedicated to the patron of fishermen, Saint Peter. The rectory is in the immediate vicinity.

The nave was built and inaugurated in 1728. According to plans by the master builder Peter Thumb, the tower and choir were built in 1731 and inaugurated in 1737. In 1888 the nave was extended and the sacristy added. From 1906 to 1907, the church was further expanded to include two side aisles. During renovation work from 1952 to 1954, the church was "turned over", meaning the altar was moved from the eastern side to the western side of the nave. In the 1990s there was a fire in the sacristy, which affected the ceiling paintings due to the smoke. The pictures have been restored today, but are still very dark due to the smoke.

==== Synagogue ====
There used to be a synagogue in Rust, built by the Jewish community of Rust after 1852 and inaugurated in 1857. During the November pogrom in 1938, the synagogue was desecrated, vandalised and damaged. In 1964, the synagogue was demolished with the approval of the Jewish high council in Karlsruhe.

A memorial was placed at the former location of the synagogue (Ritterstraße) in 1999. It contains the three former archways of the portals. They bear the inscription: „Hüte deinen Fuß wenn du in das Haus Gottes gehst. Er ist nahe zu hören.“ (“Be careful when you enter the house of God. He can be heard close by.”)

==== Old town hall ====
The "Alte Rathaus" ("Old town hall") is the community's former town hall. Originally built from 1844 to 1845, it was expanded to include a bell and clock tower in 1892. In 1989 the building was demolished and rebuilt, making the old town hall more recently built than the current town hall. Today the building contains a bank on the ground floor and a room used as a community hall on the upper floor.

=== Recurring events ===
Every year on the first weekend in September, the Rust Street Festival is held. The Euro Dance Festival takes place in Europa-Park in February and March. Since 1995, the live show "Immer wieder Sonntags" ("Always on Sundays") has been produced in Europa-Park every Sunday in the summer months and broadcast on the channel Das Erste.

== Economy and Infrastructure ==
=== Tourism ===
In addition to Europa-Park, which attracts several million visitors every year, there is the Taubergießen nature reserve, one of the few remaining river floodplain landscapes in Germany.

In 2014, Germany's first climate change garden was opened at the Rheinauen Nature Center northwest of Rust. The garden's most notable feature is an 18-meter high observation tower.

Rust has been a state-recognised resort town since 2005.

=== Traffic ===
Since 2002, Rust has a motorway exit (57b) on the Bundesautobahn 5 (federal motorway 5) (Hattenbacher triangle–Weil am Rhein). The municipality is connected to Lahr, Ettenheim, Ringsheim, Orschweier and Herbolzheim and is part of the Ortenau tariff association. The next train stop is Ringsheim, about 2 km away, and since the introduction of the EuroCity Express there is even long-distance transport to connect to Europa-Park. The long-distance bus line MeinFernbusFlixbus maintains a connection to Rust via the Freiburg – Strasbourg – Karlsruhe route. The next Rhine crossing, by free ferry, is 5 km away in the neighboring village Kappel to Rhinau (F).

=== Local companies ===
The municipality of Rust is home to Europa-Park. Currently welcoming approximately 5.6 million visitors per year, containing more than 100 attractions and shows, Europa-Park is the largest theme park in the German-speaking countries and the largest seasonal theme park in the world. It employs around 3,600 people and indirectly secures up to 8,500 jobs (mainly in the region). This makes the park one of the largest employers in the region.

=== Education ===
Since 2016 the community secondary school has been merged with the school in Kappel-Grafenhausen. Rust also has a primary school within the same buildings as the secondary school.
