= Weisweil =

Weisweil may refer to:

- Weisweil (Emmendingen), a municipality in the district of Emmendingen in Baden-Württemberg in Germany
- Weisweil (Klettgau), a village in the municipality of Klettgau in Baden-Württemberg in Germany
