= Malterdingen =

- Municipality
- Coat of arms

- Location of Malterdingen within Emmendingen district
- Interactive map of Malterdingen
- Location within Germany Location within Baden-Württemberg
- Coordinates: 48°09′41″N 07°47′40″E
- Country: Germany
- State: Baden-Württemberg
- Admin. region: Freiburg
- District: Emmendingen

Government
  - Mayor (2018–26): Hartwig Bußhardt

Area
  - Total: 11.14 km^{2} (4.30 sq mi)
- Elevation: 192 m (630 ft)

Population (2025-12-31)
  - Total: 3,479
  - Density: 312.3/km^{2} (808.8/sq mi)
- Time zone: UTC+01:00 (CET)
  - Summer (DST): UTC+02:00 (CEST)
- Postal codes: 79364
- Dialling codes: 07644
- Vehicle registration: EM
- Website: www.malterdingen.de

Malterdingen is a town in the district of Emmendingen in Baden-Württemberg in Germany.

== Demographics ==
Population development:

Year	Inhabitants
1950	1.840
1961	2.006
1970	2.195
1980	2.191
1990	2.369
2000	2.738
2010	3.017
2018	3.250
