= Biederbach =

- Municipality
- Coat of arms

- Location of Biederbach within Emmendingen district
- Interactive map of Biederbach
- Location within Germany Location within Baden-Württemberg
- Coordinates: 48°11′40″N 8°1′13″E
- Country: Germany
- State: Baden-Württemberg
- Admin. region: Freiburg
- District: Emmendingen
- Subdivisions: 19

Government
  - Mayor (2018–26): Rafael Mathis

Area
  - Total: 31.36 km^{2} (12.11 sq mi)
- Elevation: 423 m (1,388 ft)

Population (2025-12-31)
  - Total: 1,728
  - Density: 55.10/km^{2} (142.7/sq mi)
- Time zone: UTC+01:00 (CET)
  - Summer (DST): UTC+02:00 (CEST)
- Postal codes: 79215
- Dialling codes: 07682
- Vehicle registration: EM
- Website: www.biederbach.de

Biederbach is a municipality in the district of Emmendingen in Baden-Württemberg in Germany.
