= Freiamt =

- Municipality
- Coat of arms

- Location of Freiamt within Emmendingen district
- Interactive map of Freiamt
- Location within Germany Location within Baden-Württemberg
- Coordinates: 48°10′7″N 7°54′46″E
- Country: Germany
- State: Baden-Württemberg
- Admin. region: Freiburg
- District: Emmendingen
- Subdivisions: 5

Government
  - Mayor (2017–25): Hannelore Reinbold-Mench

Area
  - Total: 52.92 km^{2} (20.43 sq mi)
- Elevation: 322 m (1,056 ft)

Population (2025-12-31)
  - Total: 4,210
  - Density: 79.6/km^{2} (206/sq mi)
- Time zone: UTC+01:00 (CET)
  - Summer (DST): UTC+02:00 (CEST)
- Postal codes: 79348
- Dialling codes: 07645
- Vehicle registration: EM
- Website: www.freiamt.de

Freiamt is a town in the district of Emmendingen in Baden-Württemberg in Germany.
