= Saalbach (Gelpe) =

Stream in Germany

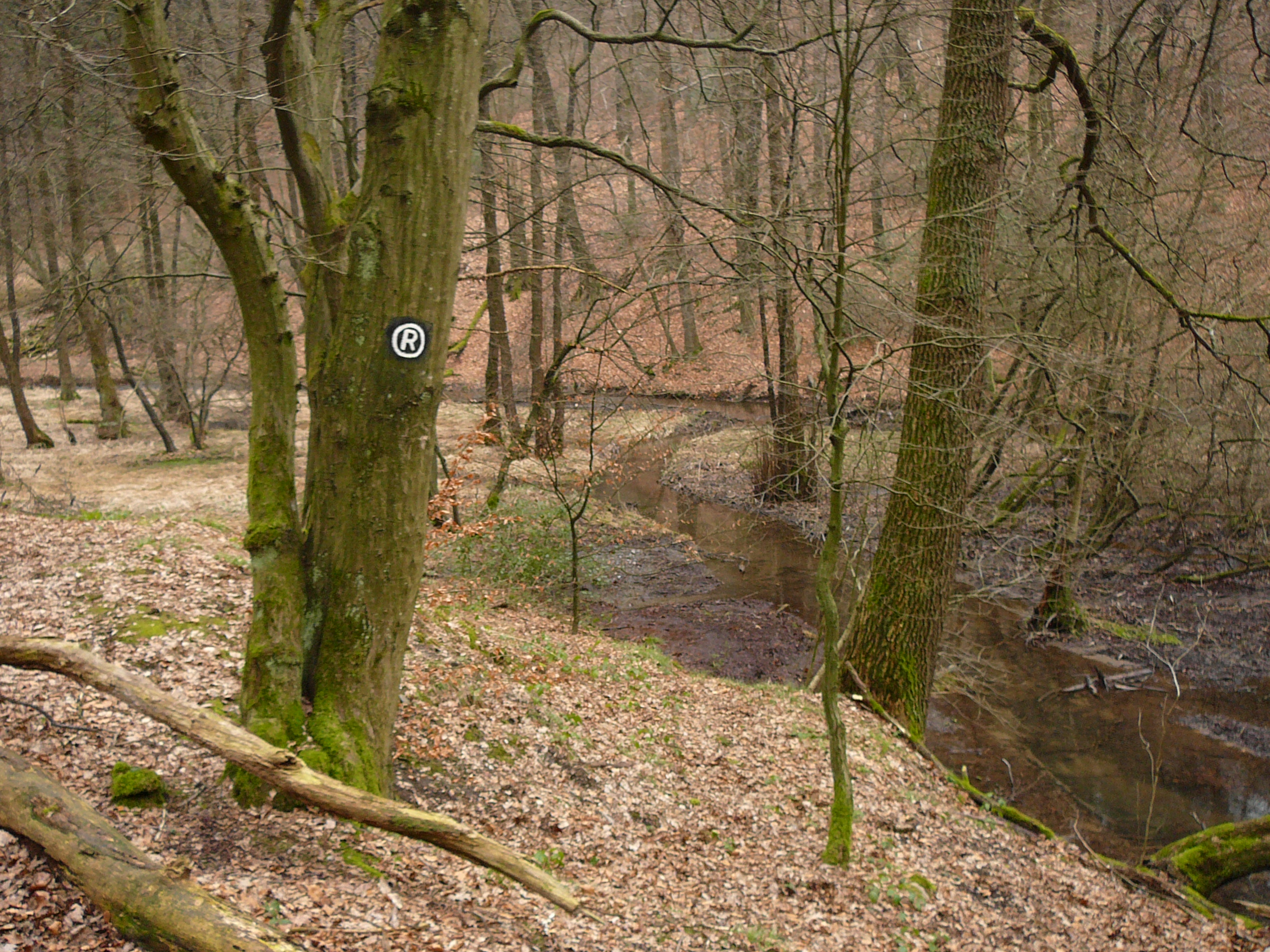

Location
- Country: Germany
- State: North Rhine-Westphalia

Physical characteristics
- Source
  - coordinates: 51.2255°N 7.1826°E
  - elevation: 295 m (968 ft)
- Mouth
  - location: Gelpe
  - coordinates: 51.2112°N 7.1659°E
  - elevation: 182 m (597 ft)
- Length: 2.498 km (1.552 mi)

Basin features
- Progression: Gelpe→ Morsbach→ Wupper→ Rhine→ North Sea

The Saalbach is a stream in North Rhine-Westphalia, Germany. It is 2.5 km long and a tributary of the Gelpe near Remscheid. The Saalbach lies within two conservation areas and its source is protected as a natural monument.

== Geography ==
=== Course ===
The Saalbach has two sources located in the west of the Ronsdorf district in southeast Wuppertal, with an elevation of 295 metres (968 ft).

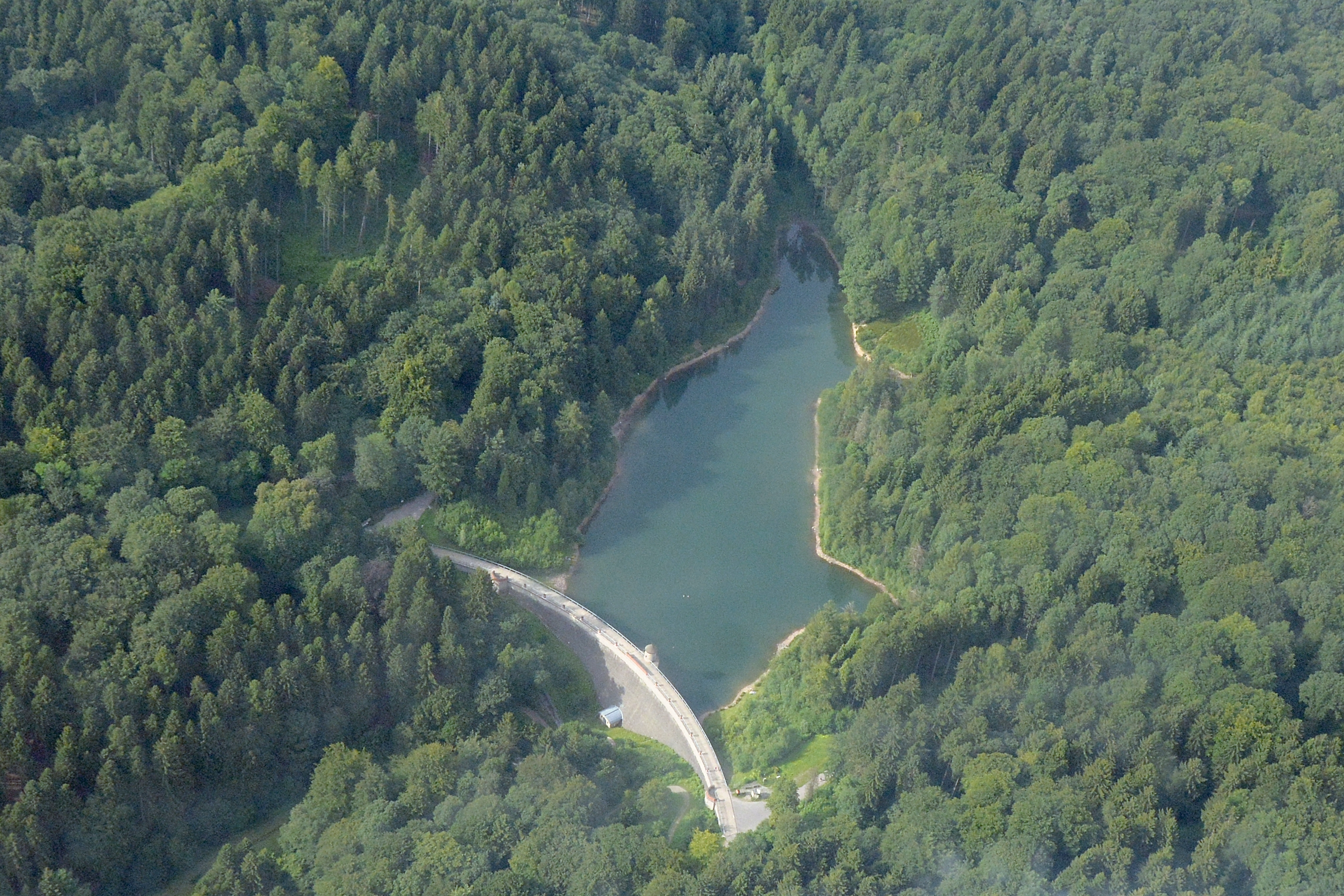
The Ronsdorfer Talsperre dam and reservoir, viewed from above in 2015

After a few hundred metres, the streem feeds into the Ronsdorf reservoir. Below the reservoir's dam it flows through several pools, constructed to harness water power from the dam for mills which are no longer in operation.

Flowing from the northeast, it merges with the Gelpe river near the "Haus Zillertal" restaurant, at an elevation of 182 metres (597 ft). The Saalbach ends approximately 112 metres (367 ft) below its source, resulting in an average slope of about 4.5%.

=== Tributaries ===
1. Saalsiefen (right), 0.1 km
2. Wüstenacker Siefen (right), 0.2 km
3. Heusiepen (left), 1.3 km, 0.7 km
4. Holthauser Gemark Siefen (right), 0.2 km
5. Zillertaler Siefen (Zillertaler Siepen) (left), 0.2 km

== Built environment and historical structures ==
The Saalbach has formed the city boundary between Wuppertal and Remscheid since 1929, previously forming the boundary of Ronsdorf and Lüttringhausen when these districts were still cities in their own right.

The most significant engineering structure on the stream is the Ronsdorfer Dam (Ronsdorfer Talsperre, also known as the Saalbachtalsperre) which was built between 1898 and 1899 to supply drinking water.

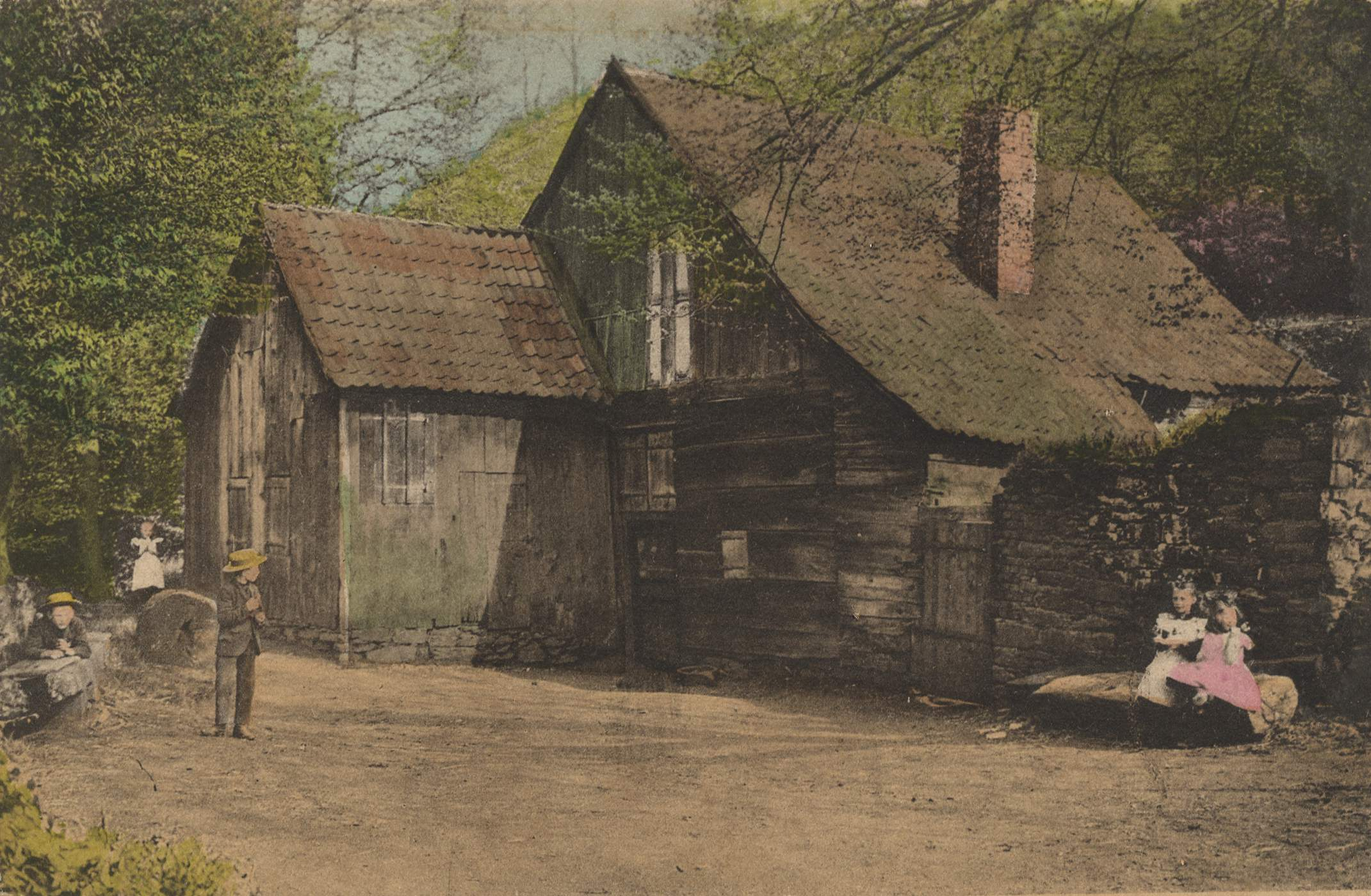
The Hundsschüppe hammer mill depicted on a postcard, ca. 1900

Along the lower course of the stream, several metalworking hammer mills were once located, although today, only the ponds remain. The most notable of these, located at the confluence with the Gelpe, was called the Hundsschüppe. Other facilities included the Hordenbachshammer, Roodekotten, and Manneshammer. An industrial history trail which opened in 1980 in the Gelpe-Saalbach conservation area includes information boards about the sites.

== See also ==
- List of rivers of North Rhine-Westphalia
