= Rehmerloh-Mennighüffer Mühlenbach =

River in Germany

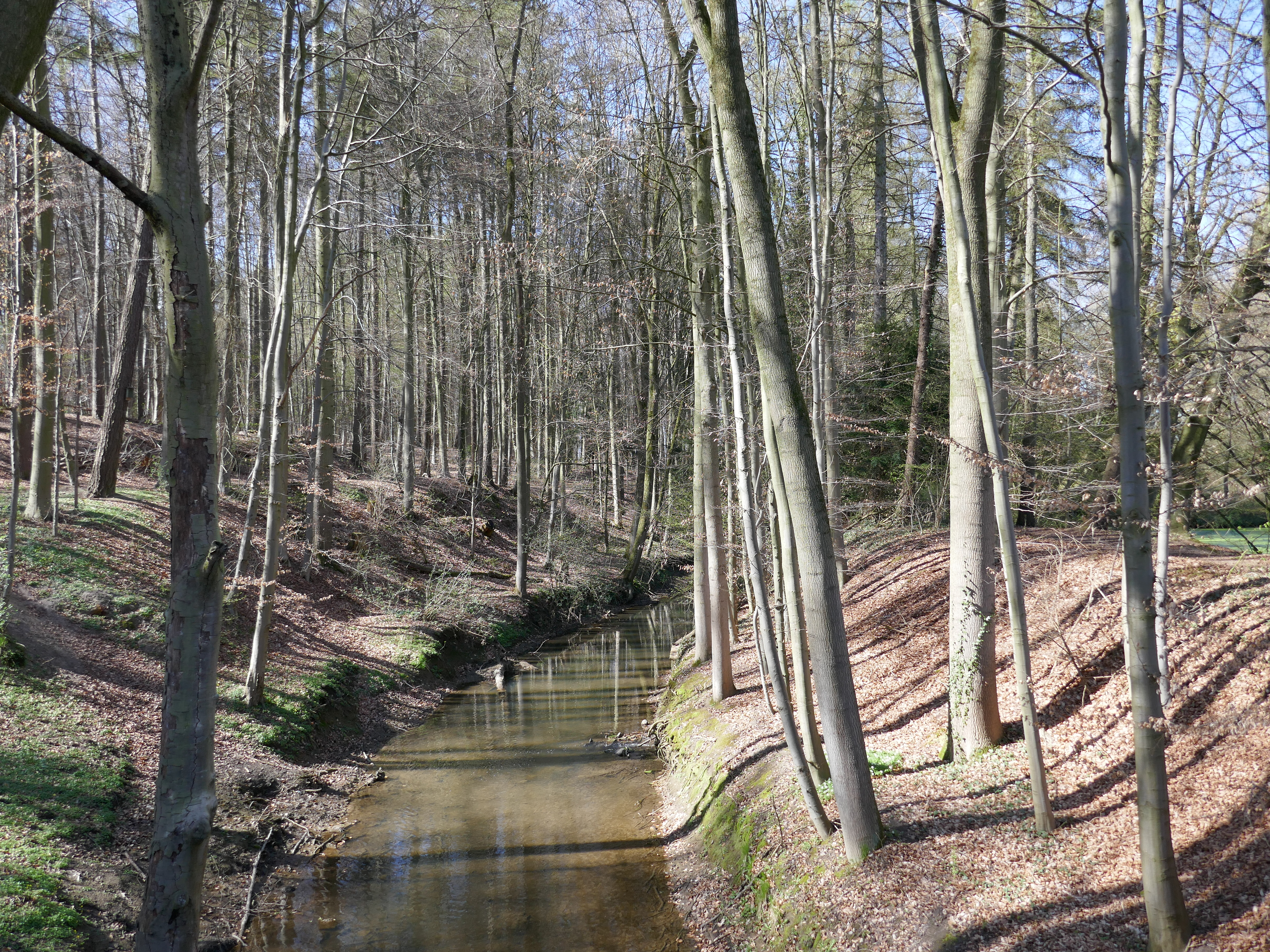

Location
- Country: Germany
- State: North Rhine-Westphalia

Physical characteristics
- Source
  - coordinates: 52.2703°N 8.5928°E
- Mouth
  - location: Werre
  - coordinates: 52.2062°N 8.7316°E
- Length: 16.4 km (10.2 mi)

Basin features
- Progression: Werre→ Weser→ North Sea

Rehmerloh-Mennighüffer Mühlenbach (also: Mühlenbach, in its upper course: Teudenbach) is a river of North Rhine-Westphalia, Germany. It is a left tributary of the Werre. Its source is near the village Oberbauerschaft. It flows generally southeast through the villages Quernheim, Rehmerloh and Ulenburg, and joins the Werre east of Löhne.

== See also ==
- List of rivers of North Rhine-Westphalia
