= Winden im Elztal =

- Municipality
- Coat of arms

- Location of Winden im Elztal within Emmendingen district
- Interactive map of Winden im Elztal
- Location within Germany Location within Baden-Württemberg
- Coordinates: 48°9′N 8°3′E
- Country: Germany
- State: Baden-Württemberg
- Admin. region: Freiburg
- District: Emmendingen
- Subdivisions: 2

Government
  - Mayor (2023–31): Klaus Hämmerle

Area
  - Total: 21.96 km^{2} (8.48 sq mi)
- Elevation: 292 m (958 ft)

Population (2025-12-31)
  - Total: 2,858
  - Density: 130.1/km^{2} (337.1/sq mi)
- Time zone: UTC+01:00 (CET)
  - Summer (DST): UTC+02:00 (CEST)
- Postal codes: 79297
- Dialling codes: 07682
- Vehicle registration: EM
- Website: www.winden-im-elztal.de

Winden is a municipality in the district of Emmendingen in Baden-Württemberg in Germany.

== History ==
In a document by Pope Alexander III dating to 1178, the church mentioned a place called "wineden inferius et superius" which refers to Niederwinden and Oberwinden (lower and upper Winden in German), first as a possession of the monastery of Waldkirch, as mentioned by St. Margaret.

Later by selling Niederwinden, the two districts were separated in 1293. In 1567 Austria took over Oberwinden and made it a part of the Habsburg possession in the Breisgau region of Further Austria. By 1805 both districts were part of the Grand Duchy of Baden.

On 1 January 1975 the two communities were brought together through local government reform to create the community of Winden im Elztal.
