= Waterbody number =

Hydrographic measure

A waterbody number, waterbody index number or waterbody ID is used for the hydrographic classification of waterbodies. Where classification only covers bodies of flowing water such as rivers, it may be called a watercourse number.

Many different systems are used in limnology to number waterbodies such as lakes, rivers and streams, ranging from basic index numbers representing their location in the river system, such as serial numbers for the major catchment areas of the rivers, or numbers indicating their hierarchical position in the system. On the basis of such numbers the aim is to give waterbodies, river sections or catchment areas a clear identification number. As a result of the systems used in various specialist fields there may even be different national and regional waterbody index numbers for the same body of water.

== Stream order ==
A general geographical and hydrographical classification uses Strahler numbers to determine the:

- Stream order – the level of the waterbody in the hydrographical hierarchical classification system (there are several different systems)

=== National terminology or systems ===
- Gewässerkennzahl ("watercourse index number"), Germany
- HZB Code ("waterbody index number"; legally defined, HZB code, OWK No., WRRL codes), Austria
- River basin number (järvinumero), Finland
- Sandre, France
- Watercourse number, Pakistan
- State Water Register, Russia
- Gewässerlaufnummer ("waterbody serial number"), Switzerland
- Čislo hydrologického pořadí ("hydrological order number"), Czech Republic
- Waterbody number, waterbody ID, United Kingdom
- Waterbody number, waterbody index number, Geographic Names Information System, United States
- Jedinstveni identifikacijski broj vodotoka ili kanala, Informacioni sistem voda, Agencija za vodno područje rijeke Save i Agencija za vodno područje Jadranskog mora [Unique identification number of a watercourse or channel, Water Information System, Agency for the Basin of the Sava River and Agency for the Basin of the Adriatic Sea], Bosnia and Herzegovina

== See also ==
Hydrological-ecological classifications:

- Water quality
- Bathing water quality – classification based on EU Directive 2006/7/EG
