= Pfatter (river) =

River in Germany

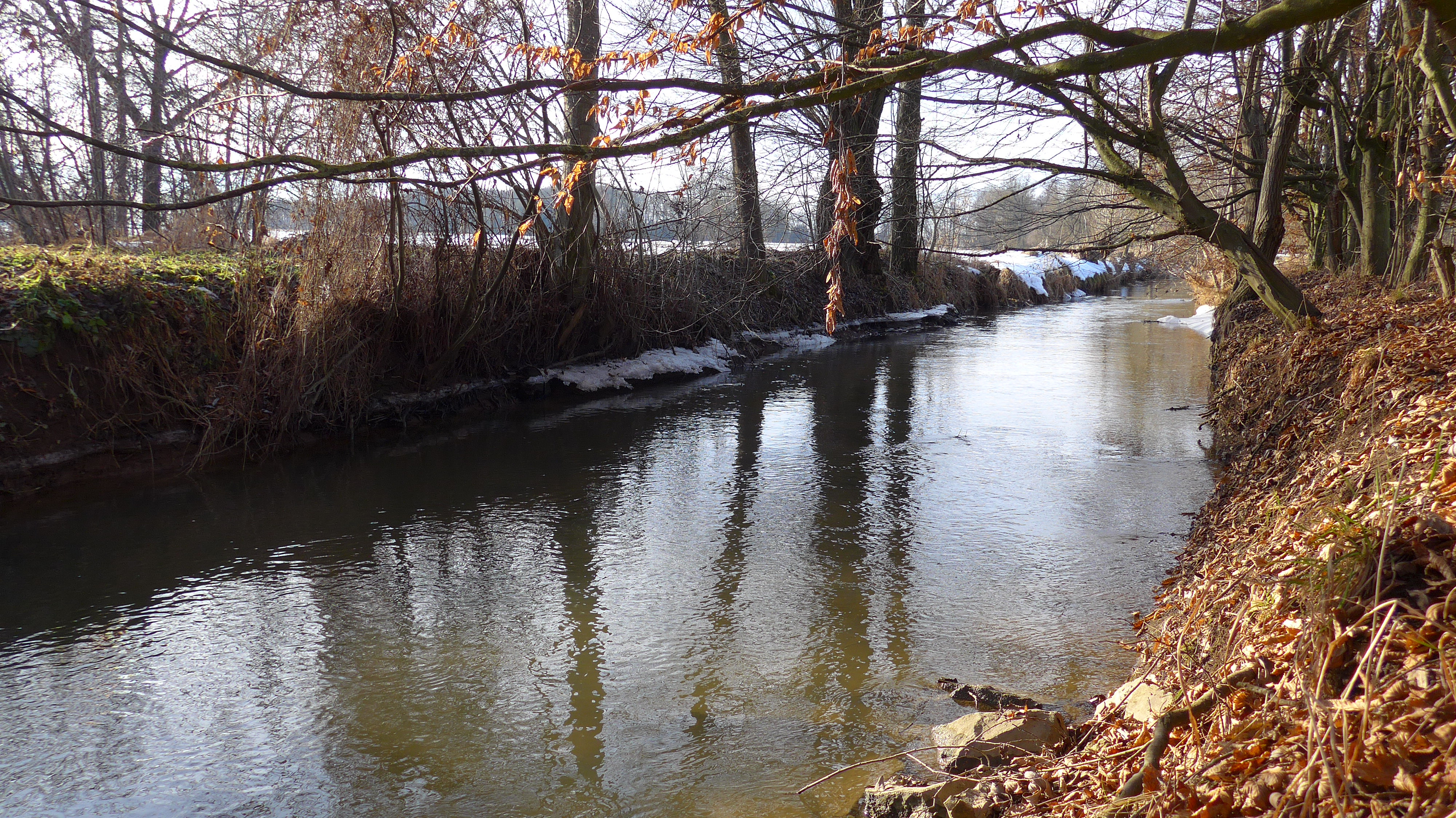
- The Pfatter at Mangolding, a borough of Mintraching

Location
- Country: Germany
- State: Bavaria

Physical characteristics
- Mouth
  - location: Danube
  - coordinates: 48.9815°N 12.4031°E
- Length: 36.7 km (22.8 mi)
- Basin size: 262 km^{2} (101 sq mi)

Basin features
- Progression: Danube→ Black Sea

Pfatter is a river of Bavaria, Germany. It flows into the Danube near the town Pfatter.

== See also ==
- List of rivers of Bavaria
