= Forchheim am Kaiserstuhl =

Forchheim
- Municipality
- Coat of arms

- Location of Forchheim within Emmendingen district
- Interactive map of Forchheim
- Location within Germany Location within Baden-Württemberg
- Coordinates: 48°09′50″N 07°42′09″E
- Country: Germany
- State: Baden-Württemberg
- Admin. region: Freiburg
- District: Emmendingen

Government
  - Mayor (2020–28): Christian Pickhardt

Area
  - Total: 10.78 km^{2} (4.16 sq mi)
- Elevation: 187 m (614 ft)

Population (2025-12-31)
  - Total: 1,393
  - Density: 129.2/km^{2} (334.7/sq mi)
- Time zone: UTC+01:00 (CET)
  - Summer (DST): UTC+02:00 (CEST)
- Postal codes: 79362
- Dialling codes: 07642
- Vehicle registration: EM
- Website: www.forchheim-am-kaiserstuhl.de

Forchheim (German pronunciation: [ˈfɔʁçhaɪm]; Alemannic German: Forcha) is the smallest municipality in the district of Emmendingen in Baden-Württemberg in Germany.

== Geography and climate ==
Forchheim (am Kaiserstuhl) is a village in the Upper Rhine Plain close to the northern edge of the Kaiserstuhl, a former volcanic region and one of the warmest areas of Germany. Its Mediterranean climate is reflected in the quality of the wines grown. The climate in the Kaiserstuhl area is close to a Mediterranean microclimate, and there is adequate rainfall year-round. However, more year-round rain occurs than in the Rhine plateau because of the closeness to the Black Forest.

Neighboring communities are (clockwise from the north): Kenzingen, Riegel am Kaiserstuhl, Endingen am Kaiserstuhl, Wyhl am Kaiserstuhl and Weisweil. It is 3 km to Endingen in the south, the district town of Emmendingen is 13 km southeast and the distance to Freiburg im Breisgau is about 26 km.

== History ==
The first documented mention of Forchheim dates back to the year 762 a.D. when Bishop Eddo of Strasbourg bequeathed the place to the Ettenheimmünster monastery. The name Forchheim comes from the Old High German (Alemannic) forcha and means pine. The ending -heim is typical for settlements from the time of the Kingdom of the Franks. The manorial rule remained with the Ettenheimmünster monastery for several hundred years; local rule was exercised by the respective district counts in Breisgau – first by the House of Zähringen, later by the Counts of Freiburg and the Counts Palatine of Tübingen with whom sovereignty fell to Further Austria in the 15th century (History on the sovereignty of the Austrians in the Vorderösterreich Museum in Endingen).

In 1803 Forchheim became part of Baden.

In 1843, 358 citizens, mostly craftsmen and their families, emigrated from the Kaiserstuhl area to Venezuela via Le Havre due to bad harvests, poverty and unemployment. They came primarily from Endingen am Kaiserstuhl, Wyhl and Oberbergen, but there were also 31 well-known people from Forchheim. After some turmoil, they found a new home in Colonia Tovar, where they were able to preserve the local culture and the Alemannic dialect to this day.

In 1952 Forchheim came to the newly formed state of Baden-Württemberg as a Baden municipality. Since Forchheim voluntarily reorganized its administration before the regional reform in Baden-Württemberg in the 1970s and merged with Endingen am Kaiserstuhl to form an administrative community, the town was able to maintain its political independence. The collaboration with Endingen am Kaiserstuhl ultimately resulted in the municipal administration association Nördlicher Kaiserstuhl, which also includes the communities of Bahlingen am Kaiserstuhl, Riegel am Kaiserstuhl, Sasbach am Kaiserstuhl and Wyhl am Kaiserstuhl.

== Municipal council ==
The local council consists of the elected volunteer local councilors and the mayor as chairman. The mayor has the right to vote in the municipal council. The local elections on May 26, 2019 in Forchheim led to the following official final result.

Results 2019
| list | vote share | seats | results 2014 |
|---|---|---|---|
| Free Voter Group | 47.1% | 4 | 58.21%, 5 seats |
| New List | 52,9 | 4 | 41.79%, 3 seats |

== Mayor ==
A new mayor was elected in Forchheim am Kaiserstuhl on September 27, 2020. Christian Pickhardt (independent) was elected for his first term of eight years with a majority of 71.0 percent of the valid votes. Opposing candidate Rainer Ordegel (independent) received 28.2 percent.

== Economy and infrastructure ==
=== Established businesses ===
Apart from a few small businesses, there is little business or industry in Forchheim. A large part of the population of the smallest municipality in the Emmendingen district works in the agricultural sector. The focus is on potato cultivation, for which Forchheim is also known beyond the district's borders. The potato cultivation area covers 120 hectares (Emmendingen district: 248 hectares), which is managed by 25 full-time agricultural operations and some part-time farmers. Many farmers market some of their products themselves at markets in the Emmendingen district and in Freiburg.

The wastewater treatment plant of the “Breisgauer Bucht” wastewater association is located on the municipality's premises, which cleans the wastewater from Freiburg and 28 cities and municipalities in the districts of Breisgau-Hochschwarzwald and Emmendingen and feeds it to the Rhine via receiving waters.

== Education ==
Attending school is not possible in Forchheim, the children go to school in Endingen am Kaiserstuhl if they do not attend the high school in Kenzingen. However, there is a kindergarten in town.

== Societies/clubs/band ==
The community of Forchheim has a large number of clubs. The largest include the music club, which celebrated its 100th anniversary in 2013, and the sports club with the football and gymnastics departments. The band Patty Moon is at home in Forchheim.

== Museum ==
The community of Forchheim has a local history museum. Mainly exhibits from the areas of agriculture and village history can be seen.

== Church of St. Johannes Baptista in Forchheim ==
- Photo1
- Photo2
- Photo3
- Photo4

== Regular events ==
The “Härdepfel Village Festival” (Härdepfel/Hardepfl is Alemannic and means potato) takes place in Forchheim every year on the second weekend in August. The small community, which is known in the region as a potato stronghold, primarily presents potato specialties.

At the beginning of November, the Rural Youth Society organize a theater evening in the multi-purpose hall.

=== Carnival ===
The carnival figure Forchemer Schell-Mi plays a special role at the carnival in Forchheim (Forchemer Fasnet).

It was founded in 1995 by the members of the “Forchemer Fasnets Kom mit he (FFK) e.V.” Forchheim is known for its “Tolle Knolle” (Super tuber). This fact gave rise to the fool figure Schell-Mi with his potato face, bulbous nose and gills. After its “baptism”, the club was able to report over 100 active Schell-Mi within a short time, and there are now around 140 carnival costume bearer called Hästräger. The FFK and the Forchemer Schell-Mi organize the Forchemer Fasnet. Annual events are: Children's Fasnet, guild evening with guilds, original indoor Fasnet, the Dirty Thursdays Long White Shirt Glunker parade, Schell-Mi parade on Carnival Friday.

The big parade through the village takes place on Carnival Tuesday (Fasnets Zischdig, Shrove Tuesday).

=== Culinary specialties ===
Forchheim is primarily known for its potato cultivation and the "Super Tubers" it produces, which, in addition to the still frequent direct marketing in the region, are offered in several variations, especially at festivals and in the few inns in the village.

== Miscellaneous ==
The local dialect belongs to Upper Rhine Alemannic.

== Personalities ==
Waldemar Frank (1903–1961), born in Forchheim as Waldemar Rosenbaum. He was a German playwriter and film producer.
