= Rhinau =

Rhinau Rhinài
- Commune
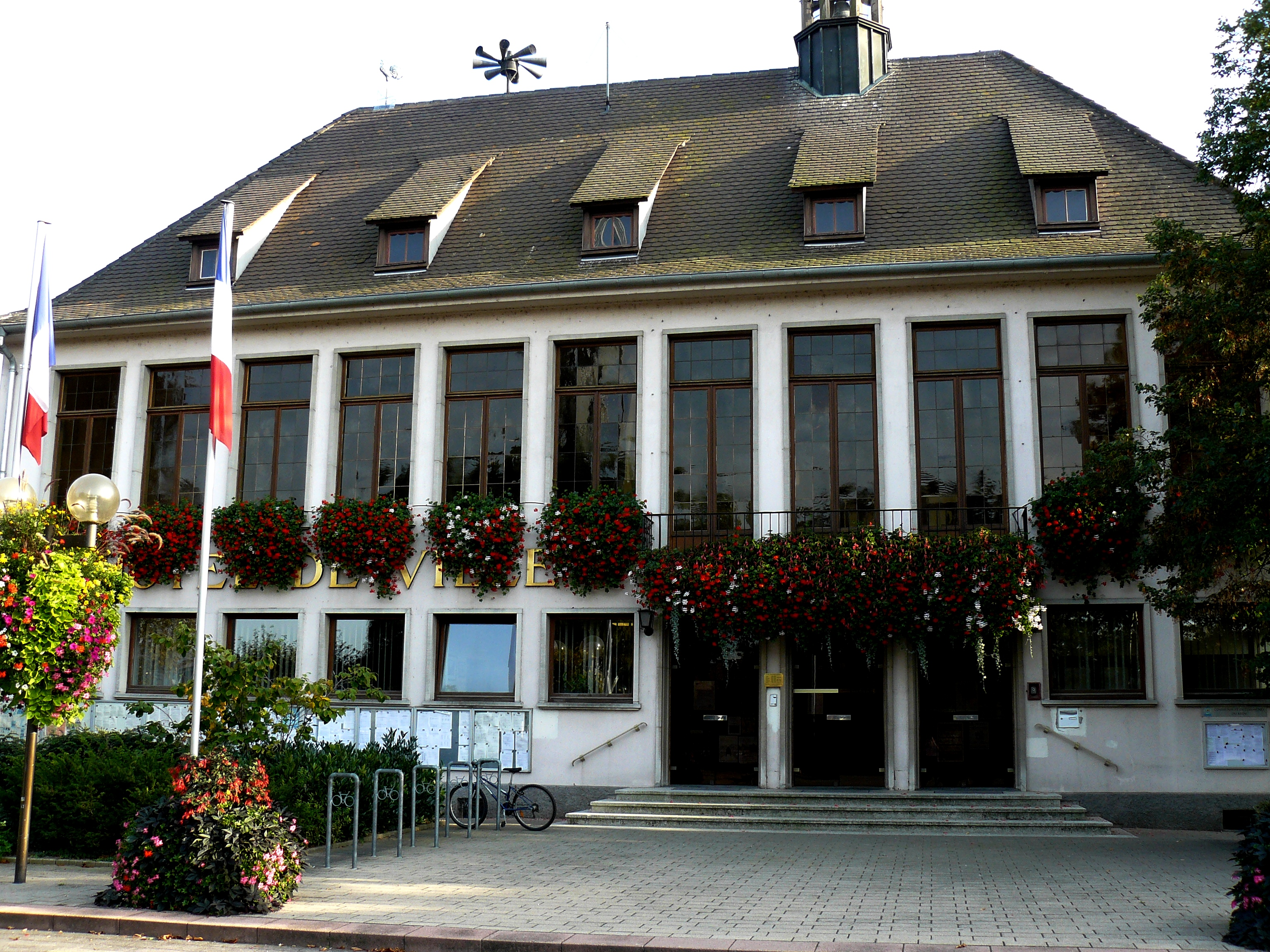
- The town hall in Rhinau

- Coat of arms
- Location of Rhinau
- Location within France Location within Grand Est
- Coordinates: 48°19′13″N 7°42′12″E
- Country: France
- Region: Grand Est
- Department: Bas-Rhin
- Arrondissement: Sélestat-Erstein
- Canton: Erstein

Government
  - Mayor (2020–2026): Marianne Horny-Gonier
- Area^{1}: 17.35 km^{2} (6.70 sq mi)
- Highest elevation: 166 m (545 ft)
- Lowest elevation: 155 m (509 ft)
- Population (2023): 2,723
  - Density: 156.9/km^{2} (406.5/sq mi)
- Time zone: UTC+01:00 (CET)
  - Summer (DST): UTC+02:00 (CEST)
- INSEE/Postal code: 67397 /67860
- ^{1} French Land Register data, which excludes lakes, ponds, glaciers > 1 km^{2} (0.386 sq mi or 247 acres) and river estuaries.

Rhinau (French pronunciation: [ʁino]; German: Rheinau) is a commune in the Bas-Rhin department of Grand Est in north-eastern France.

Until 1398, the village was located on the bank of the Rhine. The present village dates from the sixteenth century. At periods of low water in the Rhine, it is possible to see the old foundations of the village, as happened in 1749.

After a flood in 1541, an uninhabited 58% of its territory (10 km²) happened to end up on the right bank of the Rhine, in Germany. The German part of Rhinau is a natural reserve, the Taubergießen. A ferry crosses the river, linking the two banks in France and Germany.

== Geography ==
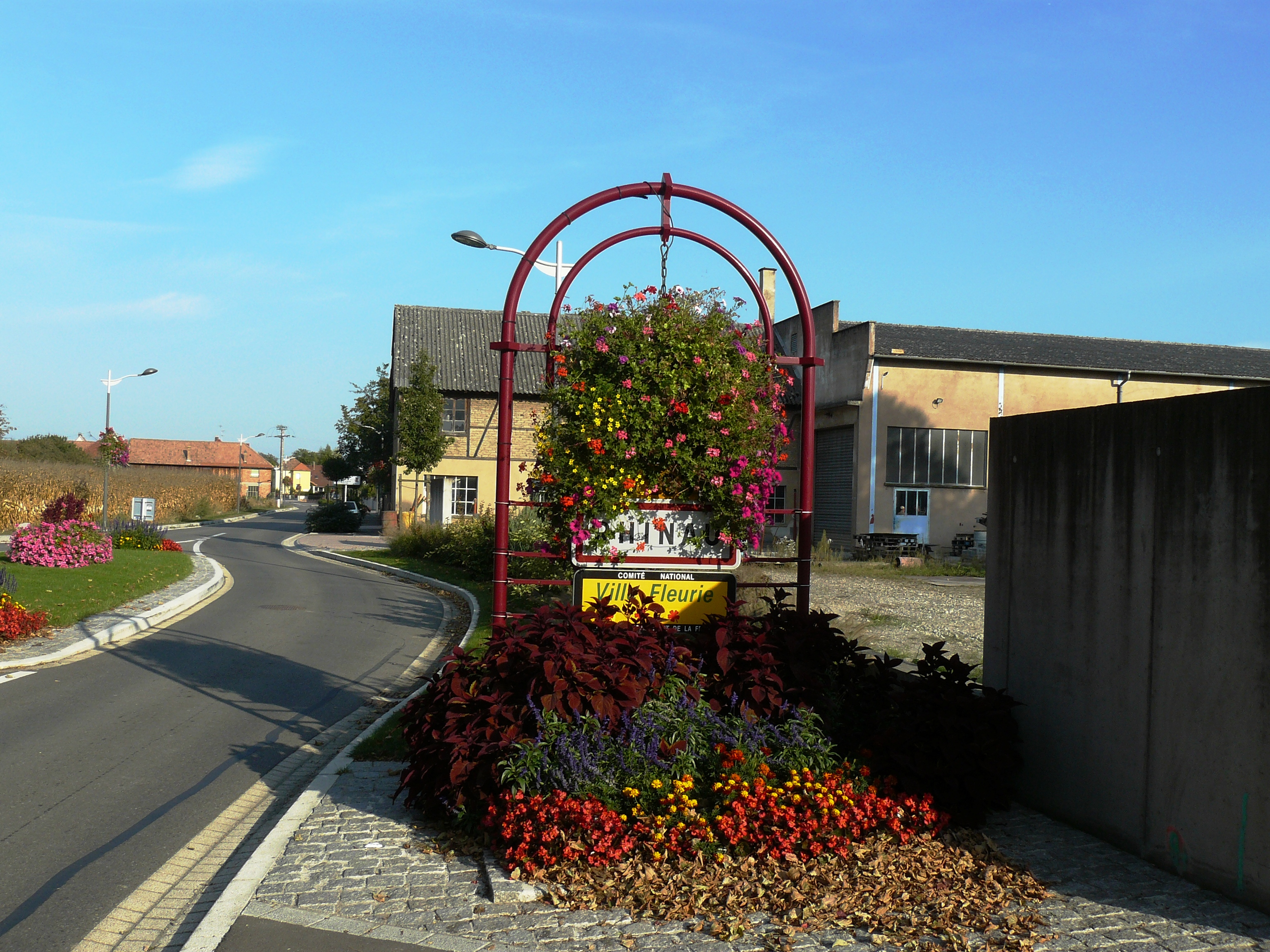

The village of Rhinau is situated on the Rhine about 30 kilometers south of Strasbourg. It is a notable city in that it has 997 hectares of territory on the right bank of the Rhine, in Germany. These 997 hectares are thus managed under German sovereignty, but, de facto run by the commune of Rhinau. This is due to a meander of the Rhine in 1541, and was made note of in the Treaty of Westphalia in 1648 as the Thirty Years Wars was brought to a close.

Rhinau belongs to the canton of Erstein and the arrondissement of Sélestat-Erstein. The inhabitants are called the Rhinois. Access to all territories of Rhinau are maintained by the ferry "Rhenanus", giving access to one of the more beautiful natural preserves of countryside in the Ried.

Rhinau is a stop in the Véloroute Rhin EV 15 (1,320 km) which connects the source of the Rhine in Andermatt, Switzerland and its terminus in Rotterdam.

== History ==
Prior to 1398, the village of Rhinau was situated at the bank of Rhine. Today's village dates from the 16th Century. At that time, the city was being gradually submerged into the waters of the Rhin. To avoid this fate, the village was rebuilt further inland, where it sits today. Though further from the river that gave it its name, the name continued.

In 1267 Rhinau allied with the city of Strasbourg. In 1290, the bishop of Strasbourg transferred the chapter of Honau to Rhinau, and conferred the full rights over this chapter to Rhinau, without prejudice for the rector of the local parish church.

== Population ==
Historical population
Year	Pop.	±% p.a.
1968	1,770	—
1975	2,216	+3.26%
1982	2,331	+0.73%
1990	2,286	−0.24%
1999	2,348	+0.30%
2007	2,613	+1.35%
2012	2,689	+0.58%
2017	2,698	+0.07%
2023	2,723	+0.15%
Source: INSEE

== See also ==
- Communes of the Bas-Rhin department
