= Kenzingen =

- Town
- Coat of arms

- Location of Kenzingen within Emmendingen district
- Interactive map of Kenzingen
- Location within Germany Location within Baden-Württemberg
- Coordinates: 48°11′30″N 7°46′6″E
- Country: Germany
- State: Baden-Württemberg
- Admin. region: Freiburg
- District: Emmendingen
- Subdivisions: 4

Government
  - Mayor (2024–32): Dirk Christian Schwier

Area
  - Total: 36.93 km^{2} (14.26 sq mi)
- Elevation: 177 m (581 ft)

Population (2025-12-31)
  - Total: 10,829
  - Density: 293.2/km^{2} (759.5/sq mi)
- Time zone: UTC+01:00 (CET)
  - Summer (DST): UTC+02:00 (CEST)
- Postal codes: 79341
- Dialling codes: 07644
- Vehicle registration: EM
- Website: www.kenzingen.de

Kenzingen (German pronunciation: [ˈkɛntsɪŋən]) is a town in the district of Emmendingen, in Baden-Württemberg, Germany. It is situated on the river Elz, 23 km north of Freiburg.

== Demographics ==
Population development:

Year	Inhabitants
1990	7,634
2001	8,904
2011	9,309
2021	10,614
