= Leopold Canal (Baden-Württemberg) =

Coordinates: 48.2512°N 7.6804°E

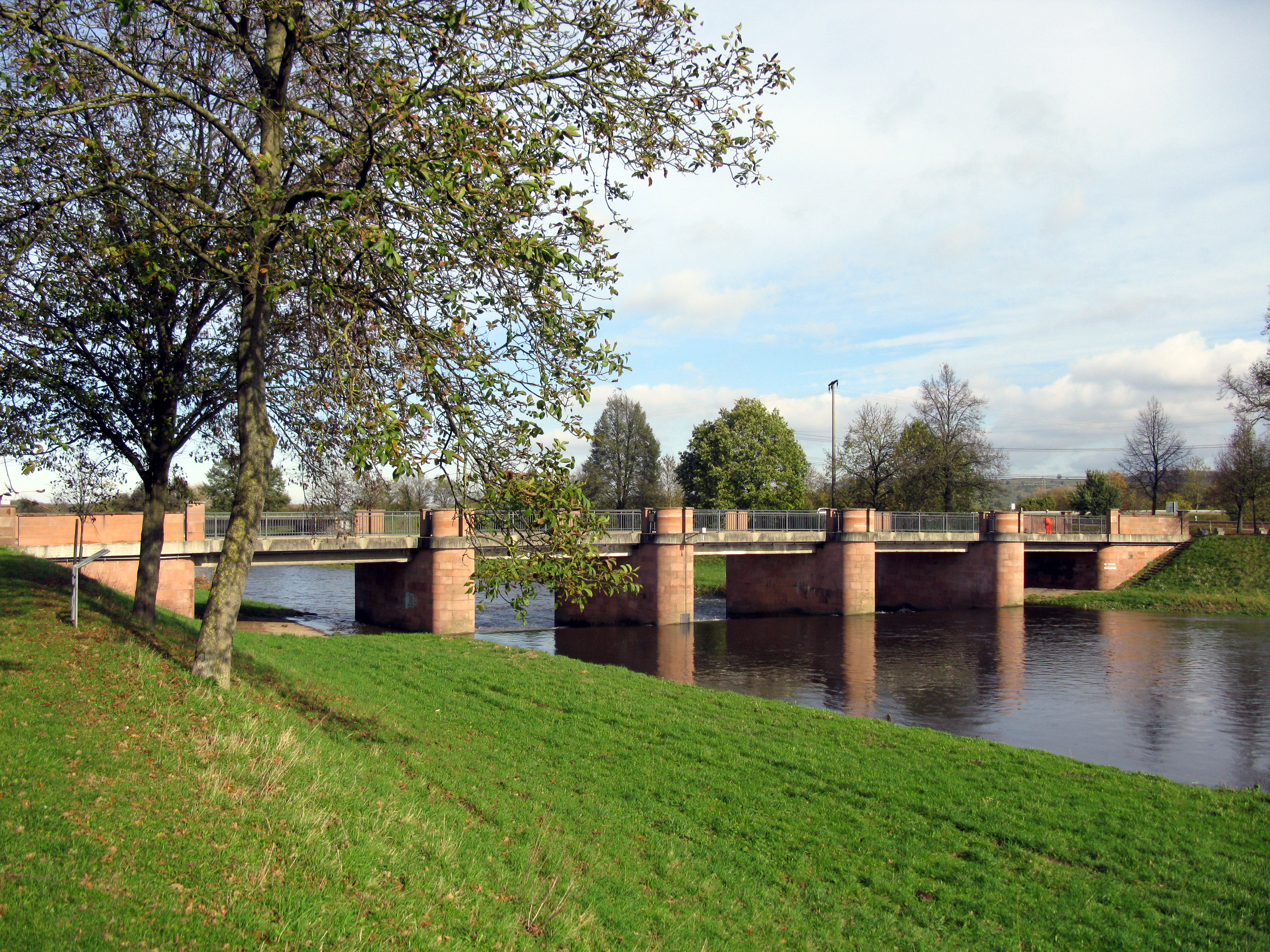

The Leopold Canal (German: Leopoldskanal) is a flood-relief canal in the German state of Baden-Württemberg. It has a length of 12.5 kilometres (7.8 mi) and flows from a junction with the River Elz, at Riegel am Kaiserstuhl, to Niederhausen, where it enters the River Rhine.
