= Emmendingen (district) =

Coordinates: 48.1°N 7.8°E

- District
- Flag Coat of arms
- Country: Germany
- State: Baden-Württemberg
- Adm. region: Freiburg
- Capital: Emmendingen

Government
  - District admin.: Hanno Hurth

Area
  - Total: 679.90 km^{2} (262.51 sq mi)

Population (31 December 2023)
  - Total: 169,470
  - Density: 249.26/km^{2} (645.57/sq mi)
- Time zone: UTC+01:00 (CET)
  - Summer (DST): UTC+02:00 (CEST)
- Vehicle registration: EM
- Website: www.landkreis-emmendingen.de

Emmendingen (German: Landkreis Emmendingen) is a Landkreis (district) in the west of Baden-Württemberg, Germany. Neighbouring districts are (from north clockwise) Ortenaukreis, Schwarzwald-Baar, Breisgau-Hochschwarzwald and the district-free city Freiburg. To the west it borders the French département Bas-Rhin.

== History ==
The district dates back to the Bezirksamt Emmendingen, which was created in 1803 when the area became part of Baden. After several additions it was converted into the district Emmendingen in 1936, when it was merged with the Amt Waldkirch. In the communal reform of 1973 the district wasn't changed - at first it was planned to merge it with the district Lahr, but that was merged into the Ortenaukreis instead.

== Geography ==
The western part of the district is located in the upper Rhine valley, including the small volcanic mountain Kaiserstuhl. This extinct volcano is one of the climatic best regions of Germany, with wine grapes growing on its sunny slopes. The eastern part of the district belongs to the Black Forest.

== Coat of arms ==
The left side of the coat of arms show the symbol of Baden. The six-topped mountain in the top right is the symbol of the Lords of Schwarzenberg, who ruled over the land around Elzach and Waldkirch; the wing in the bottom right is the symbol of the Lords of Üsenberg, who owned the land around Endingen, Herbolzheim and Kenzingen.

== Cities and towns ==
Clickable map of towns and municipalities in the district

Cities	Towns
1. Elzach; 2. Emmendingen; 3. Endingen (Kaiserstuhl); 4. Herbolzheim; 5. Kenzingen; 6. Waldkirch	1. Bahlingen (Kaiserstuhl); 2. Biederbach; 3. Denzlingen; 4. Forchheim am Kaiserstuhl; 5. Freiamt; 6. Gutach im Breisgau; 7. Malterdingen; 8. Reute (Breisgau); 9. Rheinhausen im Breisgau; 10. Riegel am Kaiserstuhl; 11. Sasbach am Kaiserstuhl; 12. Sexau; 13. Simonswald; 14. Teningen; 15. Vörstetten; 16. Weisweil; 17. Winden im Elztal; 18. Wyhl (Kaiserstuhl)
Administrative districts	1. Bahlingen (Kaiserstuhl); 2. Biederbach; 3. Denzlingen; 4. Forchheim am Kaiserstuhl; 5. Freiamt; 6. Gutach im Breisgau; 7. Malterdingen; 8. Reute (Breisgau); 9. Rheinhausen im Breisgau; 10. Riegel am Kaiserstuhl; 11. Sasbach am Kaiserstuhl; 12. Sexau; 13. Simonswald; 14. Teningen; 15. Vörstetten; 16. Weisweil; 17. Winden im Elztal; 18. Wyhl (Kaiserstuhl)
1. Denzlingen-Vörstetten-Reute; 2. Elzach; 3. Emmendingen; 4. Kenzingen-Herbolzheim; 5. Nördlicher Kaiserstuhl; 6. Waldkirch	1. Bahlingen (Kaiserstuhl); 2. Biederbach; 3. Denzlingen; 4. Forchheim am Kaiserstuhl; 5. Freiamt; 6. Gutach im Breisgau; 7. Malterdingen; 8. Reute (Breisgau); 9. Rheinhausen im Breisgau; 10. Riegel am Kaiserstuhl; 11. Sasbach am Kaiserstuhl; 12. Sexau; 13. Simonswald; 14. Teningen; 15. Vörstetten; 16. Weisweil; 17. Winden im Elztal; 18. Wyhl (Kaiserstuhl)
