= Gelpe =

River in Germany

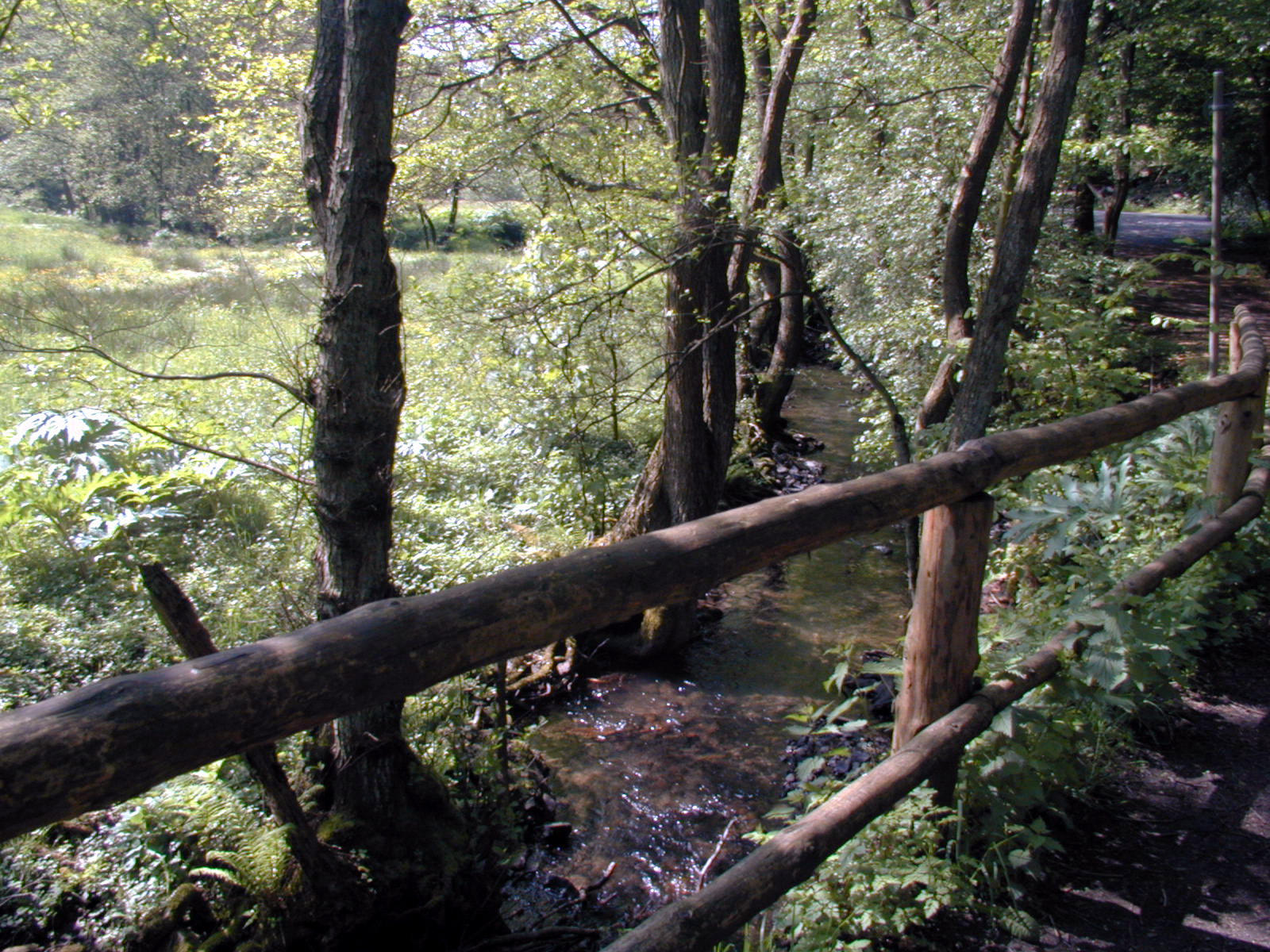

Location
- Country: Germany
- States: North Rhine-Westphalia

Physical characteristics
- Mouth
  - location: Morsbach
  - coordinates: 51.2017°N 7.1664°E

Basin features
- Progression: Morsbach→ Wupper→ Rhine→ North Sea

Gelpe is a small river of North Rhine-Westphalia, Germany. It flows into the Morsbach near Remscheid.

== See also ==
- List of rivers of North Rhine-Westphalia
