= Rheinhausen im Breisgau =

- Municipality
- Coat of arms

- Location of Rheinhausen im Breisgau within Emmendingen district
- Interactive map of Rheinhausen im Breisgau
- Location within Germany Location within Baden-Württemberg
- Coordinates: 48°13′36″N 7°42′45″E
- Country: Germany
- State: Baden-Württemberg
- Admin. region: Freiburg
- District: Emmendingen

Government
  - Mayor (2020–28): Jürgen Louis

Area
  - Total: 22.0 km^{2} (8.5 sq mi)
- Elevation: 174 m (571 ft)

Population (2025-12-31)
  - Total: 4,347
  - Density: 198/km^{2} (512/sq mi)
- Time zone: UTC+01:00 (CET)
  - Summer (DST): UTC+02:00 (CEST)
- Postal codes: 79365
- Dialling codes: 07643
- Vehicle registration: EM
- Website: www.rheinhausen.de

Rheinhausen im Breisgau (before April 2025: Rheinhausen, German pronunciation: [ʁaɪnˈhaʊzn̩]) is a municipality in the district of Emmendingen in Baden-Württemberg in Germany.

== Geography ==
Rheinhausen im Breisgau is located in the northern Breisgau region on the Rhine river. Along the Rhine, it includes part of the Taubergießen Nature Reserve, one of the largest nature reserves in Baden-Württemberg.

=== Neighboring communities ===
To the west, across the Rhine river in France, is the Rhinau Island Nature Reserve, in the Schœnau commune of the Bas-Rhin department in France's Alsace region. Across the town's southern border is the village of Weisweil, to the east are the towns of Kenzingen and Herbolzheim, and to the north is the town of Rust, in the Ortenau district.

=== Villages ===
In May 1972, the municipality of Rheinhausen was formed by combining two formerly independent communities, now each a village (Dorf), Niederhausen and, to its south, Oberhausen.
