= Morsbach (Wupper) =

River of North Rhine-Westphalia, Germany

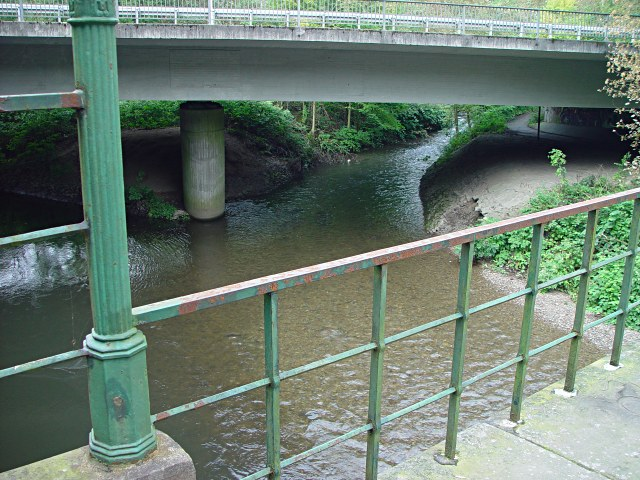

Location
- Country: Germany
- State: North Rhine-Westphalia

Physical characteristics
- Mouth
  - location: Wupper
  - coordinates: 51.1656°N 7.1361°E
- Length: 15.1 km (9.4 mi)

Basin features
- Progression: Wupper→ Rhine→ North Sea

Morsbach is a river of North Rhine-Westphalia, Germany. It flows into the Wupper near Solingen.

== See also ==
- List of rivers of North Rhine-Westphalia
