= List of show mines =

This is a list of show mines, that are currently open to the public. Focus is on underground mining activity.

== Argentina ==
Name	Province	Municipality	Notes	Location	Picture
Minas de Wanda	Misiones	Wanda	Amethyst	25.9709°S 54.5641°W	

== Australia ==
Name	State	Municipality	Notes	Location	Picture
Historic Daydream Mine	New South Wales	Broken Hill	Silver, started 1882, relatively old mine for Australia	31.8830°S 141.3270°E	
Big Opal Mine	New South Wales	Lightning Ridge	Black Opal	29.4524°S 147.9672°E	
Chambers of The Black Hand	New South Wales	Lightning Ridge	Black Opal	29.4563°S 147.9669°E	
Walk-in Mine	New South Wales	Lightning Ridge	Black Opal	29.4026°S 147.9685°E	
Bald Hill Mine	New South Wales	Hill End	Gold	33.0333°S 149.4166°E	
Bobby Dazzler Sapphire Mine	Queensland	Rubyvale	Sapphire	23.4193°S 147.6993°E	
Miners Heritage Walk In Mine	Queensland	Rubyvale	Sapphire	23.4082°S 147.6892°E	
Wheal Hughes	South Australia	Moonta	Copper, might be closed in 2014	34.0550°S 137.6140°E	
Umoona Opal Mine and Museum	South Australia	Coober Pedy	Opal, major parts of the city are underground, due to the excessive summer heat	29.0100°S 134.7552°E	
Old Timers Mine	South Australia	Coober Pedy	Opal	29.0089°S 134.7594°E	
Douggies Underground Mine Tours	Tasmania	Queenstown	Copper, 300 m shaft; also named: C.M.T. Underground Mine Tour	42.0795°S 145.5546°E	
Beaconsfield Mine & Heritage Centre	Tasmania	Beaconsfield	Gold, formerly Grubb Shaft Gold and Heritage Museum	41.2016°S 146.8158°E	
Central Deborah Gold Mine	Victoria	Bendigo	Gold, offers adventure tours to 228 m depth	36.7648°S 144.2704°E	
Long Tunnel Extended Mine	Victoria	Walhalla	Gold, with gold rush ghost town	37.9389°S 146.4493°E	
State Coal Mine	Victoria	Wonthaggi	Coal	38.6187°S 145.5966°E	

== Austria ==
Name	State	Municipality	Notes	Location	Picture
Terra Mystica	Kärnten	Bad Bleiberg	Lead	46.6287°N 13.6486°E	
Schaubergwerk Knappenberg	Kärnten	Hüttenberg		46.9344°N 14.5686°E	
Seegrotte Hinterbrühl	Niederösterreich	Hinterbrühl	Gypsum; flooded mine with underground boat tours	48.0860°N 16.2573°E	
Schaubergwerk Grillenberg	Niederösterreich	Payerbach	Iron	47.6929°N 15.8929°E	
Salzwelten Hallstatt	Oberösterreich	Hallstatt	Salt; mining since Bronze Age; oldest industrial complex in Europe	47.5564°N 13.6450°E	
Salzwelten Hallein	Salzburg	Hallein	Salt	47.6671°N 13.0898°E	
Kupferzeche Larzenbach	Salzburg	Hüttau, district Niedernfritz	Copper, from the 13th century till 1869	47.4164°N 13.3070°E	
Barbarastollen Leogang	Salzburg	Leogang	Mining started before the Middle Ages	47.4395°N 12.6993°E	
Schaustollen Mühlbach am Hochkönig	Salzburg	Mühlbach am Hochkönig	Copper; the adit continues through the mountain to the municipality Sankt Johann im Pongau and served as emergency route for the residents, in cases the street could not be used	47.3795°N 13.1232°E	
Schaubergwerk Hochfeld	Salzburg	Neukirchen am Großvenediger	Copper	47.2209°N 12.2740°E	
Silberbergwerk Ramingstein	Salzburg	Ramingstein	Silver, mining came to an end 1780; everything kept in its original state, without electric light	47.0768°N 13.8596°E	
Schaubergwerk Sunnpau	Salzburg	Sankt Veit im Pongau	Copper; mining started before the Middle Ages	47.3373°N 13.1369°E	
Zinkwand hiking trail	Salzburg and Steiermark	Weißpriach, Rohrmoos-Untertal	Silver, cobalt, zinc and others; via ferrata to a 300 m long adit, that underpasses the main chain of the alps	47.2697°N 13.6821°E	
Salzwelten Altaussee	Steiermark	Altaussee	Salt	47.6514°N 13.7392°E	
Silberbergwerk Arzberg	Steiermark	Arzberg	Silver	47.2493°N 15.5139°E	
Erzberg	Steiermark	Eisenerz	Iron	47.5250°N 14.9116°E	
Magnesitbergwerk Keltenberg	Steiermark	Hohentauern	Magnesite	47.4457°N 14.4634°E	
Sunfixl cave	Steiermark	Kohlschwarz	Underground sandstone mine	47.1386°N 15.0939°E	
Schaubergwerk Oberzeiring	Steiermark	Oberzeiring	Silver	47.2523°N 14.4863°E	
Paradeisstollen Radmer	Steiermark	Radmer	Copper; medieval, mining railway	47.5438°N 14.7564°E	
Annastollen Bromriesen	Steiermark	Rohrmoos-Untertal, district Obertal	Silver and nickel	47.3166°N 13.6834°E	
Knappenlöcher Fieberbrunn	Tirol	Fieberbrunn	Adits in original state, no electric light	47.4906°N 12.5291°E	
Schaubergwerk Ulpenalpe	Tirol	Fügen	Iron, copper, cobalt, pyrite, quartz; could only be reached via the upper station of the cable car Spieljochbahn	47.3265°N 11.7799°E	
Schaubergwerk Kupferplatte	Tirol	Jochberg	Copper	47.3892°N 12.4254°E	
Schwazer Silberbergwerk	Tirol	Schwaz	Silver; one of the largest silver mines in the Middle Ages; most important financial source for Fugger and the Habsburg dynasties	47.3536°N 11.7275°E	
Schaubergwerk Lehenlahn	Tirol	Wildschönau	Silver; medieval	47.4291°N 11.9712°E	
Goldschaubergwerk	Tirol	Zell am Ziller	Gold	47.2216°N 11.8956°E	
Bergwerk in Bartholomäberg	Vorarlberg	Bartholomäberg, district Worms		47.0980°N 9.9116°E	

== Belgium ==
Name	Province	Municipality	Notes	Location	Picture
Schieferstollen Recht	Wallonia	Sankt Vith	Slate	50.3235°N 6.0485°E	
Blegny Mine	Wallonia	Blegny	Coal, UNESCO-World Heritage Site	50.6870°N 5.7239°E	
Bertrix mine	Wallonia	Bertrix, near Neufchâteau	Slate; also named: Au Coeur de l'Ardoise	49.8125°N 5.2722°E	
Les minières de silex néolithique de Spiennes à Mons	Wallonia	Mons-Spiennes	Flintstone, prehistoric, UNESCO-World Heritage Site	50.4306°N 3.9786°E	
Carriere souterraine de Geromont	Wallonia	Comblain-au-Pont	Limestone, in-ground, near stalactite cave Grotte de l'Abîme	50.4306°N 3.9786°E	
Ardoisalle	Wallonia	Vresse-sur-Semois	Slate	49.8361°N 4.9666°E	
Carrières souterraines de la Malogne	Wallonia	Cuesmes	Phosphate, in limestone	50.4257°N 3.9219°E	

== Bolivia ==
Name	Department	Municipality	Note	Location	Picture
Mines in Cerro Rico	Potosí	Potosí	Silver and zinc, for centuries largest silver mine worldwide, still active, with guided tours	65.7496°S 19.6189°W	
Mina San José	Oruro	Oruro	Silver, Zinc	17.9602°S 67.1235°W	

== Brazil ==
Name	State	Municipality	Notes	Location	Picture
Mine des Chico Rei	Minas Gerais	Ouro Preto	Gold, huge size; also named: Encardideira	20.3862°S 43.4996°W	
Minas da Passagem	Minas Gerais	Mariana	Gold, they claim to be the largest gold show mine worldwide, over 30 km underground galleries, underground lake	20.3913°S 43.4385°W	
Mina Fonte Meu Bem Querer	Minas Gerais	Ouro Preto	Gold	20.3877°S 43.4914°W	
Mina Velha	Minas Gerais	Ouro Preto	Gold, started 1704	20.3857°S 43.4822°W	

== Bulgaria ==
Name	State	Municipality	Notes	Location	Picture
Mining museums of Pernik	Pernik Province	Pernik	Coal	42.609167°N 23.028889°E	

== Canada ==
Name	Province	Municipality	Notes	Location	Picture
Atlas Coal Mine	Alberta	Drumheller	Kohle	51.3283°N 112.4825°W	
Bellevue Underground Mine	Alberta	Crowsnest Pass	Kohle	49.5778°N 114.3654°W	
Bell Island's Mine	Newfoundland and Labrador	Wabana at Bell Island	Iron; galleries below the sea	47.6457°N 52.9474°W	
Simpson Mine	Ontario	Bruce Mines	Copper	46.2833°N 83.7833°W	
Cobalt Mining Museum	Ontario	Cobalt	Silver	47.3956°N 79.6856°W	
Mine Cristal	Québec	Bonsecours	Rock crystal	45.4434°N 72.2818°W	
Mines Capelton	Québec	Capelton	Copper	45.3393°N 71.8471°W	
Thetford Mines	Québec	Thetford Mines	Chrysotile	46.0961°N 71.3259°W	

== Colombia ==
Name	Region	Municipality	Notes	Location	Picture
Catedral de Sal de Zipaquirá	Cundinamarca	Zipaquira	Salt	5.0187°N 74.009°W	

== Croatia ==
Name	County	Region	Notes	Location	Picture
Rudnik Zrinski	Zagreb	Medvednica	Lead and zinc, medieval; nearby mountain hut Graik	45.9107°N 15.9443°E	

== Czech Republic ==
Name	Region	Municipality	Notes	Location	Picture
Grafitový důl Český Krumlov	South Bohemian	Český Krumlov	Graphite	48.8158°N 14.3038°E	
Kovárna	Hradec Králové	Pec pod Sněžkou	Iron, arsenic and copper	50.7278°N 15.7314°E	
Chrustenická šachta	Central Bohemian	Chrustenice	Iron	50.0044°N 14.1650°E	
Hornické Muzeum Příbram	Central Bohemian	Příbram	Biggest mining museum in Czech Republic, incl. 3 show adits	49.6827°N 13.9870°E	
Hora Svaté Kateřiny	Ústí nad Labem	Hora Svaté Kateřiny	Silver and copper; galleries partly on German territory; might be temporarily closed	50.6101°N 13.4366°E	
Štola Sv. Jana Evangelisty	Ústí nad Labem	Jiřetín pod Jedlovou	Silver	50.8749°N 14.5652°E	
Štola Starý Martin	Ústí nad Labem	Krupka	Tin	50.6973°N 13.8466°E	
Štola Země zaslíbená	Ústí nad Labem	Měděnec	Malachite	50.4242°N 13.1115°E	

== Denmark ==
Name	Region	Municipality	Notes	Location	Picture
Thingbæk Kalkminer, Bundgaards Museum	North Denmark	Skorping	Coal, nowadays also cheese production	56.8319°N 9.8117°E	
Daugbjerg Kalkgruber	Central Denmark	Stoholm	Lime	56.4577°N 9.0486°E	
Mønsted Kalkgruber	Central Denmark	Stoholm	Lime, claim to be the largest in the world	56.4561°N 9.1663°E	

== Germany ==
Name	State	Municipality	Notes	Location	Picture
Tiefer Stollen	Baden-Württemberg	Aalen, district Wasseralfingen	Iron, also asthma therapy	48.8552°N 10.1211°E	
Salzbergwerk Kochendorf	Baden-Württemberg	Bad Friedrichshall, district Kochendorf	Common salt; active period 1899–1994	49.2183°N 9.2101°E	
Himmlisch Heer	Baden-Württemberg	Dornstetten, district Hallwangen	Silver	48.4898°N 8.5031°E	
Besucherbergwerk Schauinsland	Baden-Württemberg	Freiburg im Breisgau	Lead, Zinc, large underground galleries	47.9111°N 7.8994°E	
Friedrichs Fundgrube	Baden-Württemberg	Freudenstadt	Silver, between 1267 und 1730	48.4582°N 8.4093°E	
Friedrichs Fundgrube	Baden-Württemberg	Großerlach	Silver, small gallery: 30 m length, from the 18th century	49.0530°N 9.5177°E	
Segen Gottes	Baden-Württemberg	Haslach	Silver	48.2921°N 8.0853°E	
Grube Teufelsgrund	Baden-Württemberg	Münstertal/Schwarzwald	Fluorite	47.8451°N 7.8201°E	
Grube Hella-Glück	Baden-Württemberg	Neubulach	Copper, silver, bismuth	48.6555°N 8.7056°E	
Grube Frischglück	Baden-Württemberg	Neuenbürg	Iron	48.8333°N 8.5929°E	
Besucherstollen Niedereschach	Baden-Württemberg	Niedereschach	Copper and lead, from the 16th century, 2 small galleries (Karl and Otto)	48.1231°N 8.4984°E 48.1312°N 8.4985°E	
Grube Wenzel	Baden-Württemberg	Oberwolfach	Silver	48.3200°N 8.2058°E	
Grube Anna-Elisabeth	Baden-Württemberg	Schriesheim	Silver, vitriol (copper sulphate)	49.4778°N 8.6736°E	
Silbergründle	Baden-Württemberg	Seebach	Lead, zinc	48.5800°N 8.1680°E	
Grube Caroline	Baden-Württemberg	Sexau	Lead, zinc	48.1255°N 7.9191°E	
Wetzsteinstollen	Baden-Württemberg	Spiegelberg	Sandstone	49.0217°N 9.4336°E	
Hoffnungsstollen	Baden-Württemberg	Todtmoos	Pyrrhotite and nickel	47.7446°N 7.9856°E	
Silberbergwerk Suggental	Baden-Württemberg	Waldkirch	Silver	48.0667°N 7.9350°E	
Grube Marie in der Kohlbach	Baden-Württemberg	Weinheim, district Hohensachsen	Lead, silver	49.51564°N 8.68044°E	
Grube Finstergrund	Baden-Württemberg	Wieden	Fluorspar	47.8328°N 7.9032°E	
Silberschacht	Bavaria	Bach a.d. Donau	Gemstone, silver	49.0256°N 12.3021°E	
Kupferberg Mine	Bavaria	Kupferberg	Copper	50.1393°N 11.5758°E	
Salzbergwerk Alte Saline	Bavaria	Bad Reichenhall	Salt	47.7210°N 12.8773°E	
Grube Stephansberg	Bavaria	Bamberg	Sand, underground; 12 km galleries, thereof 2 km open to the public	49.8864°N 10.8873°E	
Salzbergwerk Berchtesgaden	Bavaria	Berchtesgaden	Salt	47.6383°N 13.0175°E	
Schaubergwerk Silberberg	Bavaria	Bodenmais	Pyrite, Vitriol	49.0574°N 13.1259°E	
Grube Grünten	Bavaria	Burgberg (Allgäu)	Iron	47.5389°N 10.3220°E	
Grube Gleißinger Fels	Bavaria	Fichtelberg, district Neubau	Biotite, Granite	50.0078°N 11.8368°E	
Schmutzlerzeche	Bavaria	Goldkronach	Gold, small mine, 35 m gallery	50.0104°N 11.7063°E	
Grube Mittlerer Name Gottes	Bavaria	Goldkronach	Gold	50.0104°N 11.7063°E	
Grube Kropfmühl	Bavaria	Hauzenberg	Graphite	48.6258°N 13.6605°E	
Fürstenzeche	Bavaria	Lam	Silver	49.1986°N 13.0766°E	
Friedrich-Wilhelm-Stollen	Bavaria	Lichtenberg	Iron, copper, fluorspar	50.3913°N 11.6857°E	
Tiefstollen Peissenberg	Bavaria	Peißenberg	Coal tar	47.7971°N 11.0579°E	
Grube Wilhelmine	Bavaria	Sommerkahl	Copper	50.0691°N 9.2719°E	
Reichhardt–Schacht	Bavaria	Stulln	Fluorspar	49.4384°N 12.1055°E	
Grube Gottessegen	Hesse	Alheim, district Oberellenbach	Barite	51.0179°N 9.6420°E	
Grube Bertsch	Hesse	Bad Wildungen, district Bergfreiheit	Copper	51.0502°N 9.0915°E	
Burgbergstollen	Hesse	Battenberg (Eder)	Iron	51.0157°N 8.6424°E	
Hessian Brown Coal Museum	Hesse	Borken	Brown coal	51.0452°N 9.2843°E	
Grube Christiane	Hesse	Diemelsee, district Adorf	Iron	51.3739°N 8.7997°E	
Grube Ypsilanta	Hesse	Dillenburg, district Oberscheld	Iron	50.7415°N 8.3692°E	
Goldbergbau Eisenberg	Hesse	Korbach, district Goldhausen	Gold, shaft: Georgschacht	51.2495°N 8.8222°E	
Grube Gustav	Hesse	Meißner, district Abterode	Barium, copper, barite	51.2115°N 9.9383°E	
Grube Fortuna	Hesse	Solms, district Oberbiel	Iron	50.5745°N 8.4230°E	
Grube Ludwig	Hesse	Wald-Michelbach	Manganese, from 1889 till 1918	49.5651°N 8.8509°E	
Grube Ludwig	Hesse	Wetzlar	Iron, alsoHausertorstollen;started 1842, November 13, from 1944 used for underground war production	50.5594°N 8.5033°E	
Schiefergrube Christine	Hesse	Willingen (Upland)	Slate	51.2984°N 8.6119°E	
Knesebeckschacht	Lower Saxony	Bad Grund (Harz)	Lead, zinc, silver, alternative names: Erzbergwerk Grund and Grube Hilfe Gottes	51.8058°N 10.2250°E	
Scholmzeche	Lower Saxony	Bad Lauterberg	Lead, zinc, iron	51.6294°N 10.4717°E	
Klosterstollen	Lower Saxony	Barsinghausen	Stone coal	52.2995°N 9.4691°E	
Grube Dorothea	Lower Saxony	Clausthal-Zellerfeld	Silver, Silver, lead glance	51.7980°N 10.3611°E	
Grube Rosenhof	Lower Saxony	Clausthal-Zellerfeld	underground wheel pit	51.8066°N 10.3136°E	
Besucherbergwerk Rammelsberg	Lower Saxony	Goslar	UNESCO-World Heritage Site	51.8875°N 10.4316°E	
Feggendorfer Stollen	Lower Saxony	Lauenau	Stone coal	52.2914°N 9.4095°E	
Grube Lautenthals Glück	Lower Saxony	Langelsheim, district Lautenthal	Lead glance, zinc blende; 150 m of underground ore transport with ships	51.8641°N 10.2825°E	
Museum Industriekultur	Lower Saxony	Osnabrück	Stone coal, with 300 m historical underground galleries	52.3151°N 8.0088°E	
Hüttenstollen Osterwald	Lower Saxony	Salzhemmendorf, district Osterwald	Stone coal	52.1144°N 9.6255°E	
Grube Catharina Neufang	Lower Saxony	Sankt Andreasberg	Lead, silver; access via Grube Samson	51.7130°N 10.5158°E	
Grube Roter Bär	Lower Saxony	Sankt Andreasberg	Iron	51.7125°N 10.5269°E	
Grube Samson	Lower Saxony	Sankt Andreasberg	Last fully operational man engine, worldwide; UNESCO-World Heritage Site	51.7130°N 10.5161°E	
Grube Wennsglückt	Lower Saxony	Sankt Andreasberg	Silver, cobalt, copper	51.7121°N 10.5274°E	
19-Lachter-Stollen	Lower Saxony	Wildemann	Lead, zinc	51.8239°N 10.2814°E	
Schieferschaubergwerk Raumland	North Rhine-Westphalia	Bad Berleburg, district Raumland	Slate	51.0232°N 8.3867°E	
Erzbergwerk Ramsbeck	North Rhine-Westphalia	Bestwig, district Ramsbeck	Lead, zinc; with operational mine railway	51.3156°N 8.4028°E	
Venetianerstollen	North Rhine-Westphalia	Bestwig, district Ramsbeck	Copper	51.3045°N 8.3972°E	
Zeche Graf Wittekind	North Rhine-Westphalia	Dortmund, district Syburg	Stone coal	51.4210°N 7.4801°E	
Grube Wohlfahrt	North Rhine-Westphalia	Hellenthal, district Rescheid	Lead, zinc	50.4346°N 6.4550°E	
Stahlberger Erbstollen	North Rhine-Westphalia	Hilchenbach, district Müsen	Iron	50.9922°N 8.0263°E	
Grube Altenberg	North Rhine-Westphalia	Kreuztal, district Littfeld	Iron, lead, zinc	51.0061°N 8.0077°E	
Kilianstollen	North Rhine-Westphalia	Marsberg	Copper	51.4533°N 8.8616°E	
Wodan-Stollen	North Rhine-Westphalia	Neunkirchen, district Salchendorf	Iron	50.7983°N 8.0187°E	
Grube Günnersdorf	North Rhine-Westphalia	Mechernich	Lead, zinc; part of mining museum Mechernich	50.5865°N 6.6492°E	
Besucherbergwerk Philippstollen	North Rhine-Westphalia	Olsberg	Iron	51.3650°N 8.5216°E	
Bleierzgrube Neu-Glück	North Rhine-Westphalia	Plettenberg	Lead	51.2216°N 7.8707°E	
Besucherbergwerk Kleinenbremen	North Rhine-Westphalia	Porta Westfalica, district Kleinenbremen	Iron	52.2306°N 9.0411°E	
Reinhold Förster Erbstollen	North Rhine-Westphalia	Siegen, district Eiserfeld	Iron; outstanding portal	50.8330°N 7.9841°E	
Grube Silberhardt	North Rhine-Westphalia	Windeck, district Öttershagen	Silver	50.8231°N 7.6430°E	
Zeche Nachtigall	North Rhine-Westphalia	Witten, district Bommern	Stone coal	51.4289°N 7.3134°E	
Grube Wilhelm (Antweiler)	Rhineland-Palatinate	Antweiler	Copper	50.4009°N 6.8322°E	
Schmittenstollen	Rhineland-Palatinate	Bad Münster am Stein-Ebernburg	Mercury	49.7904°N 7.7817°E	
Mühlenberger Stollen	Rhineland-Palatinate	Bleialf	Lead	50.2394°N 6.2864°E	
Besucherbergwerk Herrenberg	Rhineland-Palatinate	Bundenbach	Slate	49.8437°N 7.3834°E	
Alvenslebenstollen	Rhineland-Palatinate	Burglahr	Gallery drainage, total length 1546 m, 400 m could be visited	50.6157°N 7.5005°E	
Fell Exhibition Slate Mine	Rhineland-Palatinate	Fell	Slate	49.7558°N 6.7990°E	
Kupferbergwerk Hosenberg	Rhineland-Palatinate	Fischbach	Copper, historical ore dressing plants	49.7546°N 7.3818°E	
Grube Holzappel	Rhineland-Palatinate	Holzappel	Lead, zinc	50.3408°N 7.8927°E	
Edelsteinmine Steinkaulenberg	Rhineland-Palatinate	Idar-Oberstein	Precious stones	49.7293°N 7.2872°E	
Grube Maria	Rhineland-Palatinate	Imsbach	Iron	49.5913°N 07.8999°E	
Weiße Grube	Rhineland-Palatinate	Imsbach	Copper, cobalt, iron, silver	49.5917°N 07.8997°E	
Römerbergwerk Meurin	Rhineland-Palatinate	Kretz	Tuff, from Roman times	50.3962°N 7.3533°E	
Grube Bendisberg	Rhineland-Palatinate	Langenfeld, district St. Jost	Lead, zinc	50.3607°N 7.1025°E	
Dachschieferbergwerk Assberg	Rhineland-Palatinate	Limbach	Slate, started 1548	50.6944°N 7.7927°E	
Eisenerzgrube Edelstein	Rhineland-Palatinate	Luckenbach	Iron	50.7019°N 7.8317°E	
Lavakeller Mendig	Rhineland-Palatinate	Mendig, district Niedermendig	Trachyte, also volcano museum Lava-Dome	50.3757°N 7.2827°E	
Pützlöcher	Rhineland-Palatinate	Newel, district Butzweiler	Copper, started by the Romans	49.8221°N 6.6344°E	
St.-Anna-Stollen	Rhineland-Palatinate	Nothweiler	Iron	49.0668°N 7.8112°E	
Museum Steinbruch Rammelsbach	Rhineland-Palatinate	Rammelsbach	Hard rock, quarryman duties, geology	49.5446°N 7.4503°E	
Grube Bindweide	Rhineland-Palatinate	Steinebach/Sieg	Iron	50.7329°N 7.8291°E	
Grube Georg	Rhineland-Palatinate	Willroth	Iron	50.5672°N 7.5222°E	
Kalkbergwerk am Königsberg	Rhineland-Palatinate	Wolfstein	Lime	49.5815°N 7.6119°E	
Saarländisches Bergbaumuseum	Saarland	Bexbach	Underground show mine in the museum	49.3494°N 7.2594°E	
Kupferbergwerk Düppenweiler	Saarland	Beckingen	Copper	49.4127°N 6.7830°E	
Schlossberghöhlen	Saarland	Homburg	Red sandstone, largest sandstone caves in Europe	49.3211°N 7.3433°E	
Kupferbergwerk Walhausen	Saarland	Nohfelden, district Saar	Copper, lead	49.5606°N 7.1294°E	
Erlebnisbergwerk Velsen	Saarland	Saarbrücken	Stone coal	49.2164°N 6.8337°E	
Besucherbergwerk Rischbachstollen	Saarland	St. Ingbert	Stone coal	49.2851°N 7.1002°E	
Emilianus-Stollen	Saarland	Wallerfangen, district St. Barbara	Copper, Azurite, Malachite; Roman mine from approx. 200 A.D.	49.3302°N 6.6798°E	
Bergbaumuseum Altenberg	Saxony	Altenberg	Zinc, also ore dressing plant	50.7628°N 13.7694°E	
Vereinigt Zwitterfeld zu Zinnwald	Saxony	Altenberg, district Zinnwald	Tin	50.7410°N 13.7654°E	
Erzgebirgsmuseum	Saxony	Annaberg-Buchholz	Silver, started 1500; museum with silver mine ‘‘Im Gößner‘‘	50.5784°N 13.0044°E	
Dorothea-Stolln	Saxony	Annaberg-Buchholz, district Cunersdorf	Silver, cobalt, copper, nickel, uranium; with underground boat tour	50.5582°N 13.0016°E	
Markus-Röhling-Stolln	Saxony	Annaberg-Buchholz, district Frohnau	Silver, cobalt, from 1500 till 1857	50.5984°N 12.9954°E	
Fundgrube St. Briccius	Saxony	Annaberg-Buchholz, district Geyersdorf	Silver, copper	50.5737°N 13.0401°E	
Vestenburger Stolln	Saxony	Aue	Tin	50.5822°N 12.7067°E	
Reichenbach-Stolln	Saxony	Lößnitz	Silver, lead glance, arsenopyrite from 1500 till 1927	50.5978°N 12.7373°E	
Marie-Louise-Stolln	Saxony	Bad Gottleuba-Berggießhübel, district Berggießhübel	Iron, copper	50.8749°N 13.9495°E	
Besucherbergwerk Bad Schlema	Saxony	Bad Schlema	Silver, uranium; also Markus-Semmler-Stollen; part of UNESCO World Heritage Site Ore Mountain Mining Region	50.6014°N 12.6567°E	
Bartholomäusschacht	Saxony	Brand-Erbisdorf, district Erbisdorf	Silver	50.8603°N 13.3195°E	
Besucherbergwerk St. Christoph	Saxony	Breitenbrunn	Iron, tin	50.4800°N 12.7545°E	
Oberer Rother Adler	Saxony	Breitenbrunn, district Rittersgrün	Iron, 19th century	50.4716°N 12.8113°E	
Besucherstolln Fuchsloch	Saxony	Breitenbrunn, district Rittersgrün	medieval mine	50.4578°N 12.8447°E	
[elsendome Rabenstein	Saxony	Chemnitz	Marble, 700 m underground gallery with lake and green grotto; option for cave diving	50.8365°N 12.8429°E	
Fortuna-Stolln	Saxony	Deutschneudorf, district Deutschkatharinenberg	Copper, silver; has seen undercover German transports of unknown goods by the end of WWII; operational steam engine from 1922	50.6114°N 13.4390°E	
Aurora Erbstolln	Saxony	Dorfhain	Silver, lead, barite, fluorite	50.9249°N 13.5506°E	
Zinngrube Am Sauberg	Saxony	Ehrenfriedersdorf	Tin, 750 years of history	50.6425°N 12.9739°E	
Himmelfahrt Fundgrube	Saxony	Freiberg	Silver, later lead and zinc; also named Besucherbergwerk Freiberg Reiche Zeche	50.9282°N 13.357°E	
Herkules Frisch Glück	Saxony	Grünhain-Beierfeld, district Waschleithe	Iron, copper, sulphur, arsene, lead glance, marble; underground lake	50.5522°N 12.8253°E	
St. Lampertus-Schacht	Saxony	Hohenstein-Ernstthal, district Ernstthal	Arsenopyrite with traces of gold and silver; formerly Saxony's most profitable gold mine	50.8052°N 12.7259°E	
Frisch Glück „Glöckl"	Saxony	Johanngeorgenstadt	Silver, bismuth, uranium	50.4283°N 12.7314°E	
Andreas-Gegentrum-Stolln	Saxony	Jöhstadt, district Steinbach	Silver, cobalt	50.5465°N 13.1400°E	
Besucherbergwerk Am Graben	Saxony	Kirchberg	Iron	50.6213°N 12.5251°E	
Altes Kalkbergwerk Miltitz	Saxony	Klipphausen, district Miltitz	Lime and marble; including visit to Adolf-von-Heynitz-Stolln; starting 1944 used as underground production plant	51.1035°N 13.4153°E	
Kalkwerk Lengefeld	Saxony	Lengefeld	Marble	50.7004°N 13.1706°E	
Besucherbergwerk Wismutstolln	Saxony	Lichtenau, district Merzdorf	Silver, medieval; starting 1950 exploration for uranium; alternative name: Alte Silberfundgrube Hülfe des Herrn am Erzberge zu Biensdorf	50.9313°N 13.0130°E	
Besucherbergwerk Trau auf Gott-Erbstolln	Saxony	Lichtenberg	Silver	50.8263°N 13.4353°E	
St. Anna Fundgrube	Saxony	Limbach-Oberfrohna, district Herrnsdorf (zu Wolkenburg-Kaufungen)	Copper, lead, silver; medieval	50.8980°N 12.6582°E	
Segen Gottes Erbstolln	Saxony	Limbach-Oberfrohna, district Uhlsdorf (Wolkenburg region)	Copper, lead, silver; medieval	50.8898°N 12.6438°E	
Rudolphschacht	Saxony	Marienberg, district Lauta	historical horse-capstan	50.6629°N 13.1439°E	
Molchner Stolln	Saxony	Marienberg, district Pobershau	Zinc, silver	50.6372°N 13.2169°E	
Grube Tannenberg	Saxony	Muldenhammer, district Tannenbergsthal	Zinc	50.4158°N 12.4596°E	
Bergbaumuseum Oelsnitz	Saxony	Oelsnitz	Stone coal; formerly VEB Steinkohlenwerk Karl Liebknecht and VEB Steinkohlenwerk Oelsnitz/Erzgeb.	50.7250°N 12.7300°E	
Gnade Gottes Erbstollen	Saxony	Olbernhau	Non-ferrous metal mining for Saigerhütte Grünthal	50.6605°N 13.3665°E	
Alaunbergwerk Ewiges Leben	Saxony	Plauen	Potash alum, between 1542 and 1846	50.4986°N 12.1353°E	
Alaunwerk Mühlwand	Saxony	Reichenbach im Vogtland, district Rotschau	Potash alum, between 1691 and 1827	50.5994°N 12.2908°E	
Alte Hoffnung Erbstolln	Saxony	Rossau, district Schönborn-Dreiwerden	Lead, copper, silver; with underground boat tour	50.9602°N 13.002°E	
Besucherbergwerk Grüner Zweig	Saxony	Schlettau	Silver, starting around 1500	50.5567°N 12.9533°E	
Fundgrube Weißer Hirsch	Saxony	Schneeberg	Silver, cobalt, bismuth, nickel; later uranium	50.5882°N 12.6376°E	
Fundgrube und Erbstollen Morgenstern	Saxony	Schwarzenberg, district Pöhla	Zinc, iron, silver, wolfram; starting 1500	50.4976°N 12.8177°E	
Besucherbergwerk Pöhla	Saxony	Schwarzenberg, district Pöhla	Zinc and uranium; 3 km underground galleries open to the public	50.4925°N 12.8202°E	
Segen Gottes Erbstollen	Saxony	Striegistal, district Gersdorf	Silver; medieval	51.066°N 13.216°E	
Wille Gottes Stolln	Saxony	Thalheim	Arsen	50.7085°N 12.8374°E	
Besucherbergwerk Am Steghaus	Saxony	Zschopau	Silver, lead glance; in neighbourhood to „Heilige-Dreifaltigkeits-Fundgrube“	50.7455°N 13.0856°E	
St. Anna am Freudenstein	Saxony	Zschorlau	Silver; also Oberer und Unterer Troster Stolln	50.5828°N 12.6581°E	
Grube Glasebach	Saxony-Anhalt	Harzgerode, district Straßberg	Fluorspar	51.6125°N 11.0608°E	
Erzgrube Büchenberg	Saxony-Anhalt	Oberharz am Brocken, district Elbingerode	Iron	51.7912°N 10.8179°E	
Drei Kronen & Ehrt	Saxony-Anhalt	Oberharz am Brocken, district Elbingerode	Iron pyrite, sulphur; formerly ‚‘Grube Einheit‘‘	51.7639°N 10.8258°E	
Röhrigschacht	Saxony-Anhalt	Sangerhausen, district Wettelrode	Copper	51.5174°N 11.2825°E	
Besucherbergwerk Am Aschenberg	Thuringia	Bad Liebenstein	Bergbautechnik in einem alten Bierkeller	50.8119°N 10.3618°E	
Besucherbergwerk Hühn	Thuringia	Brotterode-Trusetal, district Trusetal	Barite and fluorspare	50.7836°N 10.4219°E	
Marienglashöhle	Thuringia	Friedrichroda	Gypsum and copper-slate	50.8625°N 10.5416°E	
Rabensteiner Stollen	Thuringia	Harztor, district Ilfeld	Stone coal	51.6023°N 10.7899°E	
Besucherbergwerk Lange Wand	Thuringia	Harztor, district Niedersachswerfen	Copper-slate	51.5691°N 10.7862°E	
Schaubergwerk Volle Rose	Thuringia	Ilmenau	Barite and fluorspore	50.6644°N 10.9236°E	
Besucherbergwerk Vereinigte Reviere	Thuringia	Kamsdorf	Iron, silver, copper	50.6442°N 11.4695°E	
Erlebnisbergwerk Merkers	Thuringia	Krayenberg, district Merkers	Salt mine; major hide away for treasures in late WWII	50.8203°N 10.1247°E	
Saalfeld Fairy Grottoes	Thuringia	Saalfeld	Alaun	50.6350°N 11.3413°E	
Besucherbergwerk Finstertal	Thuringia	Schmalkalden, district Asbach	Iron	50.7287°N 10.4955°E	
Schaubergwerk Morassina	Thuringia	Schmiedefeld	Alaun	50.5353°N 11.2255°E	
Erlebnisbergwerk Glückauf	Thuringia	Sondershausen	Salt	51.3699°N 10.8466°E	
Besucherbergwerk Schwarzer Crux	Thuringia	Suhl, district Vesser	Iron	50.6031°N 10.7928°E	
Märchen- und Sandsteinhöhle	Thuringia	Walldorf	Sand (underground)	50.6119°N 10.3850°E	

== Finland ==
Name	Province	Municipality	Notes	Location	Picture
Lampivaara Ametyst Mine	Lappland	Lampivaara	Amethyst	63.2404°N 30.0055°E	
Tytyri gruvmuseum	Southern Finland Province	Lohja	Lime	60.2644°N 24.0681°E	

== France ==
Name	Region	Département	Municipality	Notes	Location	Picture
Caverne du dragon	Picardie	Aisne	Oulches-la-Vallée-Foulon	Lime; medieval	49.4414°N 3.7324°E	
Catacombs of Paris	Île-de-France		Paris	Lime, gypsum; starting 18th century: used as necropolis for over 6 million people	48.8340°N 2.3323°E	
Mine de Blanzy	Burgundy	Saône-et-Loire	Blanzy	Coal	46.7014°N 4.3826°E	
Gabe Gottes	Alsace	Haut-Rhin	Sainte-Marie-aux-Mines	Silver	48.2303°N 7.1642°E	
Saint Louis Eisenthür	Alsace	Haut-Rhin	Sainte-Marie-aux-Mines	Silver	48.2452°N 7.1831°E	
Silvergrube St. Barthélemy	Alsace	Haut-Rhin	Sainte-Marie-aux-Mines	Silver	48.2405°N 7.1801°E	
Saint Jean Engelsbourg	Alsace	Haut-Rhin	Sainte-Marie-aux-Mines	Silver; alternative name Parc Tellure	48.2136°N 7.1362°E	
Mine St. Nicolas	Alsace	Haut-Rhin	Steinbach	Lead, silver, iron, copper	47.8205°N 7.1522°E	
Mine Temoin	Languedoc-Roussillon	Gard	Alès	Coal	44.1321°N 4.0665°E	
Pioch Farrus Mine	Languedoc-Roussillon	Gard	Cabrières	Copper; oldest mine in France	43.5797°N 3.3692°E	
Mine de Vielle-Aure	Midi-Pyrénées	Hautes-Pyrénées	Vielle-Aure	Manganese	42.8131°N 0.2959°W	
Mine du Val de Fer	Lorraine	Meurthe-et-Moselle	Neuves-Maisons	Iron	48.6156°N 6.1087°E	
Musée des Mines de Fer Aumetz	Lorraine	Moselle	Aumetz	Iron	49.4228°N 5.9491°E	
Mines de Fer de Neufchef	Lorraine	Moselle	Neufchef	Iron	49.3256°N 6.0280°E	
St. Joseph	Lorraine	Vosges	La Croix-aux-Mines	Silver; medieval; altgernative name: Mine d’argent de la Croix aux Mines	48.2239°N 7.0508°E	
La Mine, grandeur nature	Lorraine	Moselle	Petite-Rosselle	Coal; largest show mine in France	49.2038°N 6.8632°E	
Minier Lewarde	Nord-Pas-de-Calais	Nord	Lewarde	Coal	50.3317°N 3.1719°E	
Mine Bleue	Pays de la Loire	Maine-et-Loire	Noyant-la-Gravoyère	Slate	47.7131°N 0.9564°W	
Mine Couriot	Rhône-Alpes	Loire	Saint-Étienne	Coal	45.43841°N 4.3763°E	
Mine de Cap Garonne	Provence-Alpes-Côte d’Azur	Var	Le Pradet	Copper	43.0813°N 6.0351°E	
Terra Vinea, Les caves Rochere	Languedoc-Roussillon	Aude	Rochere	Gypsum	43.0516°N 2.9275°E	
Cathédrale d'Images	Provence-Alpes-Côte d’Azur	Bouches-du-Rhône	Les Baux-de-Provence	Lime	43.7438°N 4.7952°E	

== Greece ==
Name	Provinz	Municipality	Notes	Location	Picture
Phocis Mining Park	Phocis	Delphi	Bauxite	38.6321°N 22.3717°E	

== Indonesia ==
Name	Province	Municipality	Notes	Location	Picture
Lubang Mbah Suro	Padang, Sumatra	Sawahlunto	Coal	0.6805°S 100.7762°E	

== Ireland ==
Name	County	Municipality	Notes	Location	Picture
Glengowla Mines	Oughterard	Galway	Silver and lead	53.4182°N 9.3732°W	
Arigna Mining Experience	Arigna	Roscommon	Coal	54.077°N 8.1206°W	

== Italy ==
Name	Province	Municipality	Notes	Location	Picture
Bergwerk Villanders	South Tyrol	Villanders	The mine of Villanders was one of the most important mines of Tirol during the Middle Ages. The mine produced silver, galena, copper, pyrite and sphalerite.	46.654196°N 11.54336°E	
Schaubergwerk Prettau	South Tyrol	Prettau (Ahrntal)	Copper	47.045104°N 12.120516°E	
BergbauWelt Ridnaun-Schneeberg	South Tyrol	Ridnaun Municipality Ratschings	Together with Passeier-Schneeberg highest lying mine in Europe	46.928317°N 11.270977°E	
BergbauWelt Passeier-Schneeberg	South Tyrol	Moos in Passeier	Together with Ridnaun-Schneeberg highest lying mine in Europe	46.900686°N 11.183386°E	
Miniere Val Trompia	Brescia	Montana di Val Trompia	Iron; minor climbing activity necessary to visit the mine; also historical furnace	45.678956°N 10.187376°E	
Miniera Marzoli di Pezzaze	Brescia	Stravignino	Iron; with mine railway	45.774853°N 10.241672°E	
Miniera Schilpario	Bergamo	Schilpario	Barite and fluorite; also named: Parco Minerario Ing. Andrea Bonicelli	46.019168°N 10.199290°E	
Miniera di Gambatesa	Genoa	Val Graveglia	Iron; active mine till August 2012	44.334561°N 9.436825°E	
Galleria Ravaccione	Massa-Carrara	Carrara	Marble; in-ground mine	44.090005°N 10.133976°E	
Parco Archeominerario di San Silvestro	Livorno	Campiglia Marittima	Lead and copper	43.076459°N 10.589732°E	

== Japan ==
Name	Prefecture	Municipality	Notes	Location	Picture
Sado gold mine	Niigata	Island Sado	Gold and Silver	38.0166°N 138.3666°E	
Iwami Ginzan Silver Mine	Shimane	Ōda	Silver; UNESCO-World Heritage Site	35.1137°N 132.4453°E	
Yubari-si Sekitan-no-Rekisimura	Hokkaido	Yubari	Coal; with large museum area	43.0683°N 141.9891°E	

== Luxembourg ==
Name	Province	Municipality	Notes	Location	Picture
Kupfergrube Stolzembourg		Stolzembourg Municipality Putscheid	Copper	49.9685°N 6.1615°E	
Musée National des Mines		Rumelange	Iron	49.4576°N 6.0219°E	
Fond-de-Gras		Petingen	Iron	49.5350°N 5.8586°E	

== Mexico ==
Name	State	Municipality	Notes	Location	Picture
Mina de El Edén	Zacatecas	Zacatecas	Gold and silver, since 1586; offers extensive guided tours	25.5543°N 100.4955°W	
Mineral de Pozos	Guanajuato	Guanajuato, Mexico		21.2219°N 101.2733°W	
Guanajuato Mines	Guanajuato	Guanajuato	Several show mines	21.0127°N 103.4939°W	

== New Zealand ==
Name	Province	Municipality	Notes	Location	Picture
Banbury Tourist Mine		Denniston	Coal; one of the oldest coal mines in New Zealand, with ghost town	41.7526°S 171.8114°E	
Mitchells Gully Gold Mine		Charleston	Gold	41.9051°S 171.4391°E	

== Netherlands ==
Name	Province	Municipality	Notes	Location	Picture
Fluweelengrot	Limburg	Valkenburg aan de Geul	Clay; with historical charcoal drawings and underground chapel; medieval	50.8602°N 5.8305°E	
Gemeentegrot	Limburg	Valkenburg aan de Geul	Lime; with historical charcoal drawings	50.8625°N 5.8288°E	
Romeinse Katakomben	Limburg	Valkenburg aan de Geul	Lime; with historical copies of Roman catacombs	50.8655°N 5.8216°E	
Steenkolenmijn Valkenburg	Limburg	Valkenburg aan de Geul	Lime; transformed to coal mine for touristic purposes	50.8563°N 5.8255°E	
Geulhemmergroeve]	Limburg	Geulhem	Lime	50.8669°N 5.7836°E	
Sibbergroeve	Limburg	Sibbe	Lime, with underground chapel from 1865	50.8206°N 5.8309°E	
Jezuïetenberg	Limburg	Maastricht	Lime; with Jesuit chapel	50.8222°N 5.6630°E	
Sint Pietersberg	Limburg	Maastricht	Lime; during cold war headquarter of NORTHAG	50.8222°N 5.6630°E	

== Norway ==
Name	County	Municipality	Notes	Location	Picture
Kongensgruve	Buskerud	Saggrenda, Kongsberg Municipality	Silver	59.6306°N 9.6017°E	
Smaragdgruvene Byrud Gård	Akershus	Minnesund, Eidsvoll Municipality	Gemstone	60.4137°N 11.1985°E	
Blaafarveværket	Buskerud	Modum Municipality	Cobalt, blue color pigments	59.9127°N 9.8875°E	
Røros Kobberverk	Trøndelag	Røros Municipality	Copper; with furnace and original miners dwelling; 2 show mines: Olavsgruva and Nyberget mine; UNESCO- World Heritage Site	62.5772°N 11.3891°E	
Rutilgruva	Telemark	Kragerø Municipality	Rutile	58.8655°N 9.3705°E	
Folldal Gruver	Innlandet	Folldal Municipality	Copper, zinc, sulphur; large mining complex with 70 buildings; operational from 1748 till 1993	62.1396°N 9.9930°E	
Orkla Industriemuseum	Trøndelag	Løkken Verk, Orkland Municipality	2 show mines	63.1247°N 9.7050°E	
Sulitjelma Besøksgruver	Nordland	Sulitjelma, Fauske Municipality	100 km north of the polar circle, 1.5 km mining railway, starting in 2015 part of the Sulitjelma Line will become museums railway; mine was operational from 1887 till 1991	67.1031°N 16.0786°E	
Gruve 3	Spitzbergen	Longyearbyen	Coal, from 1969 till 1996	78.2375°N 15.4455°E	

== Pakistan ==
Name	Region	Municipality	Notes	Location	Picture
Khewra Salt Mine	Pind Dadan Khan	Khewra	Salt	32.6479°N 73.0083°E	

== Poland ==
Name	Voivodeship	Municipality	Notes	Location	Picture
Kopalnia Uranu w Kletnie	Dolnośląskie	Kletno	Uranium, since 1948	50.2481°N 16.8452°E	
Sztolnie Kowary	Dolnośląskie	Kowary	Iron; uranium since 1948	50.7588°N 15.8466°E	
Muzeum Górnictwa i Hutnictwa Złota	Dolnośląskie	Złoty Stok	Gold; mining railway, underground waterfall	50.4391°N 16.8746°E	
Podziemia kredowe w Chełmie	Lubelskie	Chełm	Lime	51.3130°N 23.4712°E	
Saltmine Wieliczka	Małopolskie	Wieliczka	Salt; huge mine, started in the 13th century, UNESCO World Heritage Site	49.9836°N 20.0555°E	
Saltmine Bochnia	Małopolskie	Bochnia	Salt; huge mine, started in the 12th century, UNESCO World Heritage Site	49.969167°N 20.4175°E	
Sztolnia Czarnego Pstrąga	Śląskie	Tarnowskie Góry	Lead and zinc; guided tours with boats	50.4302°N 18.8005°E	
Zabytkowa Kopalnia Srebra	Śląskie	Tarnowskie Góry	Silver; 1740 m tour length, 270 m with boats, open-air steam engine museum	50.4255°N 18.8496°E	
Skansen Górniczy Królowa Luiza	Śląskie	Zabrze	Coal, since 1791; 1.5 km guided tour	50.2975°N 18.8061°E	
Zabytkowa Kopalnia Węgla Kamiennego Guido	Śląskie	Zabrze	Coal; Steinkohle; visits to the 170 m and the 320 m levels	50.2897°N 18.7916°E	
Prahistoryczne Kopalnie Krzemienia w Krzemionkach	Śląskie	Swietokrzyski	Firestone, prehistoric	50.9692°N 21.4855°E	
Saltmine Kłodawa	Wielkopolskie	Kłodawa	Salt, with coloured salt in blue and pink	52.2380°N 18.9220°E	

== Portugal ==
Name	District	Municipality	Notes	Location	Picture
Cova dos Mouros	Faro	Ribeira da Foupana	Copper; prehistoric	37.3990°N 7.6979°W	

== Republic of China, Taiwan ==
Name	Provinz	Municipality	Notes	Location	Picture
Jinguashi Mine	Jinguashi	Rueifang	Gold, also named: Jinguashi Gold Ecological Park	25.1090°N 121.8576°E	
Affe Ecological Park	Jinguashi	Rueifang	Coal	25.0865°N 121.8278°E	

== Romania ==
Name	District	Municipality	Notes	Location	Picture
Salina Turda	Siebenbürgen	Turda	Salt	46.5765°N 23.7945°E	
Salina Praid	Siebenbürgen	Praid near Sovata	Salt	46.5508°N 25.1251°E	

== Slovakia ==
Name	Province	Municipality	Notes	Location	Picture
Baňa Cígeľ		Idrija	Brown coal; 2 km overhead monorail ride to enter the mine then 500 m walking tour	48.7337°N 18.6345°E	
Štôlna Bartolomej		Banská Štiavnica	Oldest mining town in Slovakia	48.4508°N 18.8871°E	

== Slovenia ==
Name	Province	Municipality	Notes	Location	Picture
Antonijev rov		Idrija	Mercury	45.999°N 14.0225°E	
Museum Mežica		Mežica	Lead and zinc	46.5120°N 14.8567°E	
Muzej Premogovništva Slovenije		Velenje	Coal	46.3724°N 15.0985°E	

== South Korea ==
Name	Province	Municipality	Notes	Location	Picture
Jasujeong mines	Ulsan	Eonyang	Amethyst	35.5484°N 129.0878°E	

== Spain ==
Name	Region	Province	Municipality	Notes	Location	Picture
Parque Minero de Riotinto	Andalusia	Huelva	Minas de Riotinto	Pyrite; gave name to the mining company Rio Tinto	37.6833°N 6.5833°W	
Mina de la Jayona	Extremadura	Badajoz	Sierra de la Jayona	Iron	38.1634°N 5.9004°W	
Minas de Arditurri	Basque	Gipuzkoa	Oiartzun	Iron; started in Roman times, till 1984	43.2838°N 1.8080°W	
Món De Sal	Catalonia	Barcelona	Barcelona	Salt	41.9135°N 1.6465°E	
Parque Arqueológico Minas de Gavà	Catalonia	Barcelona	Gavà	Prehistoric mine (approx. 4000 BD)	41.3099°N 2.001°E	
Minas de Manganeso de Puras de Villafranca	Castile and León	Burgos	Belorado	Manganese	42.3781°N 3.2424°W	
La Union	Murcia	Murcia	La Union	Silver, lead, zinc, pyrite; large mining region with many adits and remains from ore processing	37.6153°N 0.8729°W	

== Sweden ==
Name	Province	Municipality	Notes	Location	Picture
Falun Mine (Falu gruva)	Dalarna	Lernbo, Municipality Smedjebacken	Copper; started in the 9th century; during 17th century 2/3 of worldwide copper production, closed 1992	60.5988°N 15.6122°E	
Flogbergets gruva	Dalarna	Lernbo, Municipality Smedjebacken	Part of Ekomuseum Bergslagen, Silver, Iron, zinc, manganese	60.1455°N 15.3047°E	
Hornkullens silvergruvor	Värmlands län	Nykroppa	Silver	59.6222°N 14.3000°E	
Stollbergs gruva	Dalarna	Lernbo, Municipality Smedjebacken	Part of Ekomuseum Bergslagen, Silver, Iron, zinc, manganese	60.1869°N 15.2791°E	
Loos Koboltgruva	Gävleborgs län	Los	Nickel; ore from this mine led 1735 to the discovery of the element nickel.	61.7422°N 15.1565°E	
Tykarpsgrottan	Skåne län	Iganberga	Lime; underground mining, because lime is very rare in Sweden	56.1695°N 13.8620°E	
Malmbergsgruvan	Norrbottens län	Gällivare	Iron; next to an active iron mine	67.1959°N 20.7080°E	
Kiruna gruva	Norrbottens län	Kiruna	Iron, magnesite; next to an active mine	67.8502°N 20.1926°E	
Bondstollen Koppaberg	Örebro län	Koppaberg	Iron, silver, gold, sulfide	59.8750°N 14.9911°E	
Skottvångs gruva	Södermanlands län	Gnesta and Strängnäs	Iron	59.1810°N 17.1354°E	
Lockgruvan	Örebro län	Nora	Iron	59.4919°N 15.0081°E	
Koppartorp	Södermanlands län	Tunaberg Municipality Nyköping	Copper, cobalt; with ghost town and many old abandoned mines	58.6369°N 16.8997°E	
Långban	Värmlands län	Filipstad	Flooded, cave diving opportunity	59.8500°N 14.2500°E	
Kristinebergsgruvan	Västerbotten	Lycksele	Copper, zinc, silver, gold	65.0586°N 18.5679°E	
Storbergets gruvor	Gävleborgs län	Torsåker	60 open pits plus small adits	60.5270°N 16.3921°E	
Sala silvergruva	Västmanlands län	Sala	Silver	64.8009°N 20.7423°E	
Vildmarksgruvan	Västerbotten	Skellefteå	Pegmatite	64.8009°N 20.7423°E	
Kleva gruva	Småland	Vetlanda	Copper, nickel; 2 km adits open to the public, underground church	57.4377°N 15.2057°E	
Fröå gruva	Åreskutan bei Åre	Skellefteå	Copper	63.4041°N 13.2083°E	

== Switzerland ==
Name	Canton	Municipality	Notes	Location	Picture
Landesplattenberg	Glarus	Engi, district Hinterdorf	Slate	46.9749°N 9.1425°E	
Silberberg Davos	Graubünden	Davos Monstein	Silver	46.7132°N 9.7587°E	
Stollen am Mot Madlain	Graubünden	Scuol, district S-charl	Silver and lead; medieval	46.7266°N 10.3277°E	
La Presta	Neuchâtel	Val-de-Travers	Asphalt	46.9319°N 6.6611°E	
Gipsmuseum Schleitheim	Schaffhausen	Schleitheim, district Oberwiesen	Gypsum	47.751389°N 8.489722°E	
Gonzen	St. Gallen	Sargans	Iron (hematite, magnetite, hausmannite)	47.0672°N 9.4338°E	
Salzbergwerk Bex	Waadt	Bex	Salt; part of an active mine	46.2608°N 7.0291°E	
Coppermine „La Lée“	Wallis	Anniviers, district Zinal		46.1065°N 7.6310°E	
Bergwerk Riedhof	Zürich	Aeugst am Albis	Braunkohle und Mergel-Bergwerk	47.2865°N 8.4824°E	
Quarzsandbergwerk Chrästel	Zürich	Buchs	Quartz sand	47.4578°N 8.4532°E	
Bergwerk Käpfnach	Zürich	Horgen	Brown coal and clay, 80 km of galleries in total	47.2533°N 8.6136°E	

== Ukraine ==
Soledar Salt Mine	Donetsk	Soledar	Salt	48.6830°N 38.0934°E

== United Kingdom ==
Name	Region	Municipality	Notes	Location	Picture
Chislehurst Caves	South East London	Chislehurst	Lime and firestone	51.4074°N 0.0575°E	
Carnglaze Caverns	Cornwall	St Neot	Shale, underground lake	50.4726°N 4.5565°W	
Geevor Tin Mine	Cornwall	Pendeen	Tin	50.1523°N 5.6760°W	
Rosevale Mine	Cornwall	Zennor near St Ives	Tin	50.1920°N 5.5679°W	
Poldark Mine	Cornwall	Helston	Tin, 18th century	50.1380°N 5.2440°W	
Goodluck Mine	Derbyshire	Middleton	Blei	53.1051°N 1.5982°W	
Heights of Abraham	Derbyshire	Matlock Bath	A cable car connects 2 mines: Great Masson Cavern and Great Rutland Cavern	53.1051°N 1.5982°W	
North of England Lead Mining Museum	Durham	Cowshill	Lead	54.7830°N 2.2730°W	
Clearwell Caves	Gloucestershire	Clearwell	Iron and ochre	51.7711°N 2.6144°W	
City of Caves	Nottinghamshire	Nottingham	Sandstone; artificial labyrinth beneath the city	52.9510°N 1.1466°W	
Florence Mine	Cumbria	Egremont	Iron	54.4785°N 3.5180°W	
Honister Slate Mine	Cumbria	Borrowdale (Lake District)	Slate (Westmorland green slate)	54.5113°N 3.1989°W	
National Coal Mining Museum	Yorkshire	Wakefield	Coal; 140 m man-ride, former mine Caphouse Colliery	53.643169°N 1.619932°W	
Ecton Mine Educational Centre	Staffordshire	Ecton, Staffordshire	Copper and lead	53.1246°N 1.8522°W	
Snailbeach Lead Mine	Shropshire	Snailbeach	Lead	52.6166°N 2.9245°W	
Cleveland Ironstone Mining Museum	North Yorkshire	Skinningrove	Ironstone	54.5700°N 0.9000°W	
Birkhill Fireclay Mine	Scotland, West Lothian	Birkhill	Fireclay	55.9933°N 3.6605°W	
Lochnell Mine, Wanlockhead Museum of Lead Mining	Scotland, Dumfries and Galloway	Wanlockead	Lead	55.3970°N 3.7770°W	
Great Orme	Wales	Llandudno	Copper; Bronze Age	53.3341°N 3.8410°W	
Sygun Copper Mine	Wales	Beddgelert	Copper	53.0183°N 4.0811°W	
Dolaucothi Gold Mines	Wales	Blaenafon	Gold; started in Roman times	52.0413°N 3.9522°W	
Llechwedd Slate Caverns	Wales	Blaenau Ffestiniog, Gwynedd	Slate	53.0046°N 3.9403°W	
Llanfair Slate Caverns	Wales	Harlech	Slate	52.8394°N 4.1132°W	
King Arthur's Labyrinth	Wales	Corris	Slate; nowadays used to visualize the life of King Arthur	52.6546°N 3.8505°W	
The Silver Mountain Experience	Wales	Llywernog	Silver	52.4132°N 3.8413°W	
Rhondda Heritage Park	Wales	Trehafod, Rhondda	Coal	51.6108°N 3.3875°W	
Big Pit National Coal Museum	Wales	Blaenafon	Coal, 90 m man-ride	51.7724°N 3.1050°W	

== United States ==
Name	State	Municipality	Notes	Location	Picture
Goldfield Ghost Town	Arizona	Apache Junction	Gold; with ghost town	33.4567°N 111.4922°W	
Copper Queen Mine	Arizona	Bisbee	Copper	31.4403°N 109.9133°W	
Good Enough Mine	Arizona	Tombstone	Silver	31.7098°N 110.0657°W	
Gold Bug Mine	California	Placerville	Gold	38.7442°N 120.7973°W	
Eagle and High Peak Mine	California	Julian	Gold	33.0811°N 116.5973°W	
Himalaya Tourmaline Mine	California	Santa Ysabel	Tourmaline; 8 km underground galleries	33.232°N 116.7591°W	
Smuggler Mine	Colorado	Aspen	Silver	39.1930°N 106.8070°W	
Lebanon Silver Mine	Colorado	Georgetown	Silver; additional attraction: Georgetown Loop Railroad	39.6972°N 105.7108°W	
Country Boy Mine	Colorado	Breckenridge	Gold; from approx. 1880	39.4824°N 106.0152°W	
Carbonate Mine	Colorado	Breckenridge	Gold; guided tours in the summer	39.4900°N 106.0284°W	
Hidee Gold Mine	Colorado	Central City	Gold	39.7870°N 105.5015°W	
Hopemore Mine	Colorado	Leadville	Gold, silver, lead, zinc	39.2453°N 106.2348°W	
Bachelor-Syracuse Mine Tour	Colorado	Ouray	Gold	38.7530°N 105.1605°W	
Mollie Kathleen Gold Mine	Colorado	Cripple Creek	Gold; 330 m man-ride	38.0594°N 107.6785°W	
Old Hundred Gold Mine	Colorado	Silverton	Gold, operated 1905 till 1973	37.8237°N 107.5850°W	
Phoenix Mine	Colorado	Idaho Springs	Gold	39.748981°N 105.565626°W	
Old New-Gate Prison & Copper Mine	Connecticut	East Granby	Copper, 18th century; later turned into a prison	41.9619°N 72.7455°W	
Consolidated Mine	Georgia	Dahlonega	Gold, caused 1828 first gold rush, see also Stockmar Gold Mine	34.5383°N 83.9700°W	
Stockmar Gold Mine im Pine Mountain Mine	Georgia	Villa Rica	Gold, caused 1826 first gold rush, see also Consolidated Mine	33.7580°N 84.8835°W	
Crystal Gold Mine	Idaho	Kellog	Gold	47.5320°N 116.0912°W	
Sierra Silver Mine	Idaho	Wallace	Silver	47.4716°N 115.9255°W	
Vinegar Hill Mine	Illinois	Galena	Lead	42.4969°N 90.4154°W	
Strataca Kansas Underground Salt Mine	Kansas	Hutchinson	Salt	38.0436°N 97.8675°W	
Portal 31	Kentucky	Lynch	Coal; huge	36.9651°N 82.9143°W	
Delaware Copper Mine	Michigan	Mohawk	Copper	47.4231°N 88.0996°W	
Iron Mountain Iron Mine	Michigan	Iron Mountain	Iron	45.7825°N 87.8654°W	
Quincy Mine	Michigan	Hancock	Copper; huge	47.1383°N 88.5697°W	
Bonne Terre Mine	Missouri	Bonne Terre	Lead; claim to have the largest underground lake worldwide	37.9227°N 90.5522°W	
Soudan Underground Mine	Minnesota	Lake Vermilion	Iron	47.8246°N 92.2562°W	
Free Enterprise Radon Mine	Montana	Boulder	Uranium; nowadays also radon-therapy	47.8246°N 92.2562°W	
Techatticup Mine und Savage Mine	Nevada	Nelson	Gold, both mines could only be visited with a boat tour on the Eldorado Canyon	35.7095°N 114.8032°W	
Chollar Mine	Nevada	Virginia City	Gold and silver; additional nearby mines: Ponderosa Mine, Comstock Gold Mill and others could be visited	39.3018°N 119.6509°W	
Sterling Hill Mine	New Jersey	Ogdensburg	Zinc	41.0830°N 74.6066°W	
Reed Gold Mine	North Carolina	Midland	Gold	35.285°N 80.4696°W	
Sheffield Mine	North Carolina	Franklin	Gemstone	35.27233°N 83.393465°W	
Tour-Ed Mine	Pennsylvania	Tarentum	Coal	40.6173°N 79.7604°W	
Lackawanna Coal Mine	Pennsylvania	Scranton	Coal	41.4168°N 75.7163°W	
Brooks Mine	Pennsylvania	Scranton	Coal; built as a show mine, reopened in 2023	41.40074°N 75.64341°W	
No. 9 Coal Mine and Museum	Pennsylvania	Lansford	Coal	40.8285°N 75.8970°W	
Pioneer Tunnel	Pennsylvania	Ashland	Coal; mining railway	40.7779°N 76.3522°W	
Seldom Seen Tourist Coal Mine	Pennsylvania	Patton	Coal	40.6668°N 78.6809°W	
Broken Boot Gold Mine	South Dakota	Deadwood	Gold	44.3707°N 103.7429°W	
Park City Silver mining	Utah	Park City	Silver	40.6594°N 111.4997°W	
Pocahontas Exhibition Coal Mine	Virginia	Pocahontas	Coal	37.3080°N 81.3497°W	
Morefield Gem Mine	Virginia	Amelia Courthouse	Gemstone	37.3579°N 77.9180°W	
Beckley Exhibition Coal Mine (Phillips-Sprague Mine)	West Virginia	Beckley	Coal	37.7841°N 81.1936°W	
Bevans Lead Mine (Platteville Mining Museum)	Wisconsin	Platteville	Lead and zinc	42.7328°N 90.4727°W	

== External links (sources) ==
- "Trier University - List of Show Mines". Trier University of Applied Sciences.
- "Network Archaeological Open-Air Museums (EXARC) - List". EXARC (Archaeological Open-Air Museums, Experimental Archaeology, Ancient Technology and Interpretation).
- "List of shocaves and show mines". Showcaves.com.
- "Society for mining archgeology (GAG) - list of show mines".
- "Bavarian Ministry of Economic Affairs and Media, Energy and Technology - List of Show Mines" (PDF). Bavarian Ministry of Economic Affairs and Media, Energy and Technology. Archived from the original (PDF) on November 29, 2014.
- "Saxonian Ministry of Economic Affairs, Labour and Technology - List of Show Mines" (PDF). Saxonian Ministry of Economic Affairs, Labour and Technology.
- "Thuringia Mining Authority - List of Show Mines" (PDF). Archived from the original (PDF) on March 1, 2014.
- "Technical University Freiberg - List of Show Mines". Technical University Freiberg.
- "Union Internationale de Spéléologie (UIS) - List of Show Mines". Union Internationale de Spéléologie.
