= Segen Gottes Show Mine =

Coordinates: 48°17′25″N 8°05′01″E

Segen Gottes Pit Segen Gottes Mine
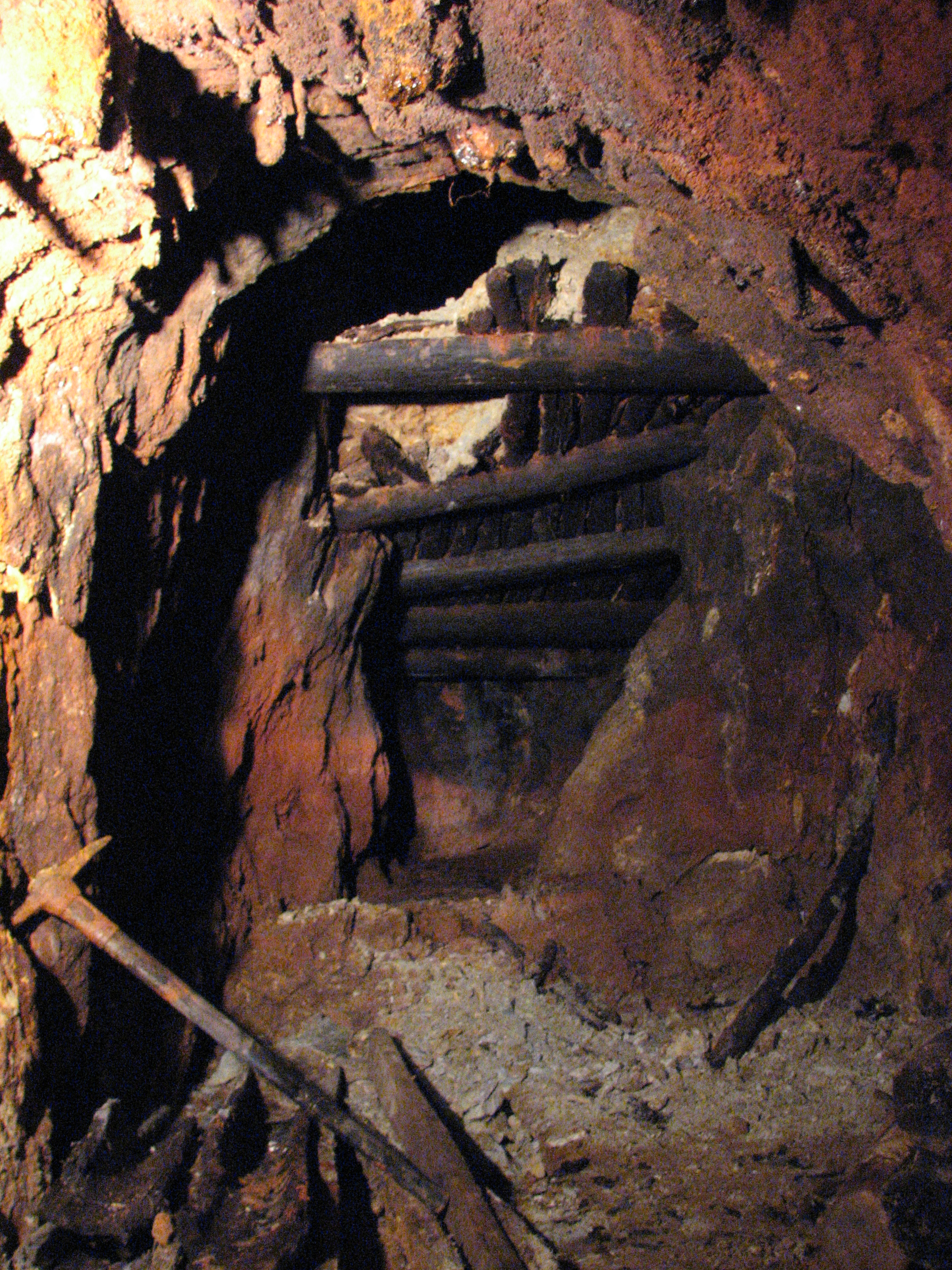

- Location within Germany
- Opened: from 13th century
- Active: Grube Segen Gottes
- Closed: 1786

The Segen Gottes Show Mine (German: Besucherbergwerk Segen Gottes) is a show mine in the parish of Schnellingen in the municipality of Haslach in the Central Black Forest in Germany.

== History ==
The silver mine of Segen Gottes was first mentioned in the records in the 13th century, but is probably older. The mine was closed in the 18th century.

In 1997 mining enthusiasts began opening the adits and mineshafts. The town of Haslach decided to make these witnesses of medieval mining open to the public as a show mine.

== See also ==
- List of show mines

== Literature ==
- Wolfgang Werner, Volker Dennert: Lagerstätten und Bergbau im Schwarzwald. Herausgabe durch Landesamt für Geologie, Rohstoffe und Bergbau, Baden-Württemberg, Freiburg im Breisgau, 2004, ISBN 3-00-014636-9.
