= Finstergrund =

Mine in Germany

Finstergrund Pit
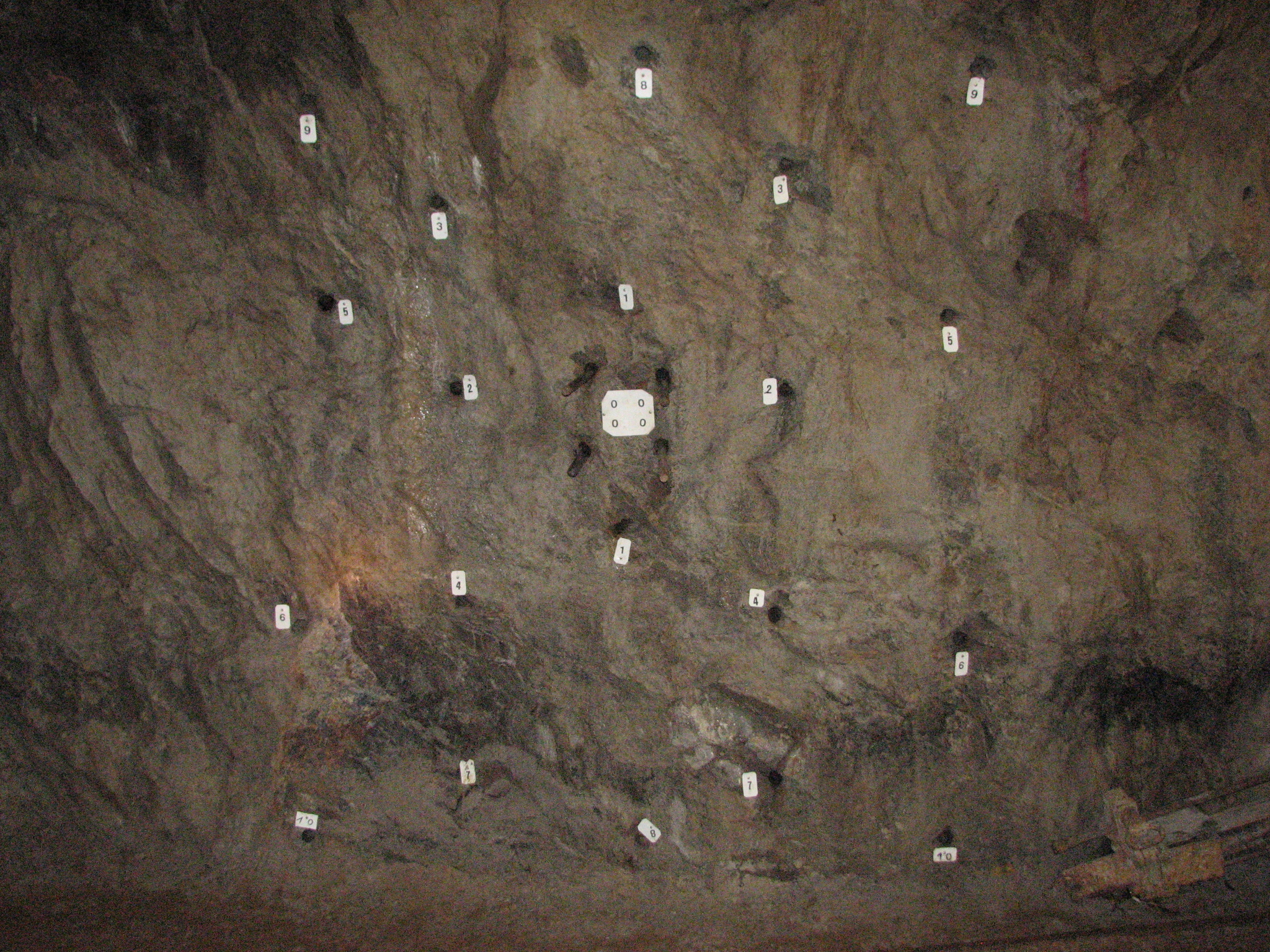
- Finstergrund Mine

- Location within Germany
- Opened: 13th century
- Active: Grube Finstergrund
- Closed: 1974

The Finstergrund Pit (German: Grube Finstergrund) near Wieden in the Black Forest in Germany is an abandoned medieval silver and lead mine that was also used in the modern era to extract fluorite and baryte. Since 1982 it has been used as a visitor mine.

== Geology ==
The most important lodes in the region around Wieden are the fluorite-barite lodes known as Tannenboden, Anton, Werner II, Hoffnung and Finstergrund, which all run in a north to south direction. The latter is 3.5 km long and the most significant hydrothermal lode in the area. The visitor mine (Gallery 5) runs along this lode for 430 metres. Its thickness varies between a few centimetres and 4 metres. About 1 metre was mined. The ore deposit is a hydrothermal fluorspar-baryte lode, in places containing rich sulfide ores. The country rock is formed by paragneisses and migmatite.

== See also ==
- List of show mines

== Literature ==
- Wolfgang Werner, Volker Dennert: Lagerstätten und Bergbau im Schwarzwald. Herausgabe durch Landesamt für Geologie, Rohstoffe und Bergbau, Baden-Württemberg, Freiburg im Breisgau, 2004, ISBN 3-00-014636-9.
