= Untertal =

Untertal may refer to:

- Rohrmoos-Untertal, a municipality in the district of Liezen in Styria, Austria
- Untertal, Glarus, a hamlet near the village of Elm in the canton of Glarus, Switzerland
