= Caroline Pit =

Silver mine in Baden-Württemberg, Germany

Caroline Pit (Grube Caroline)
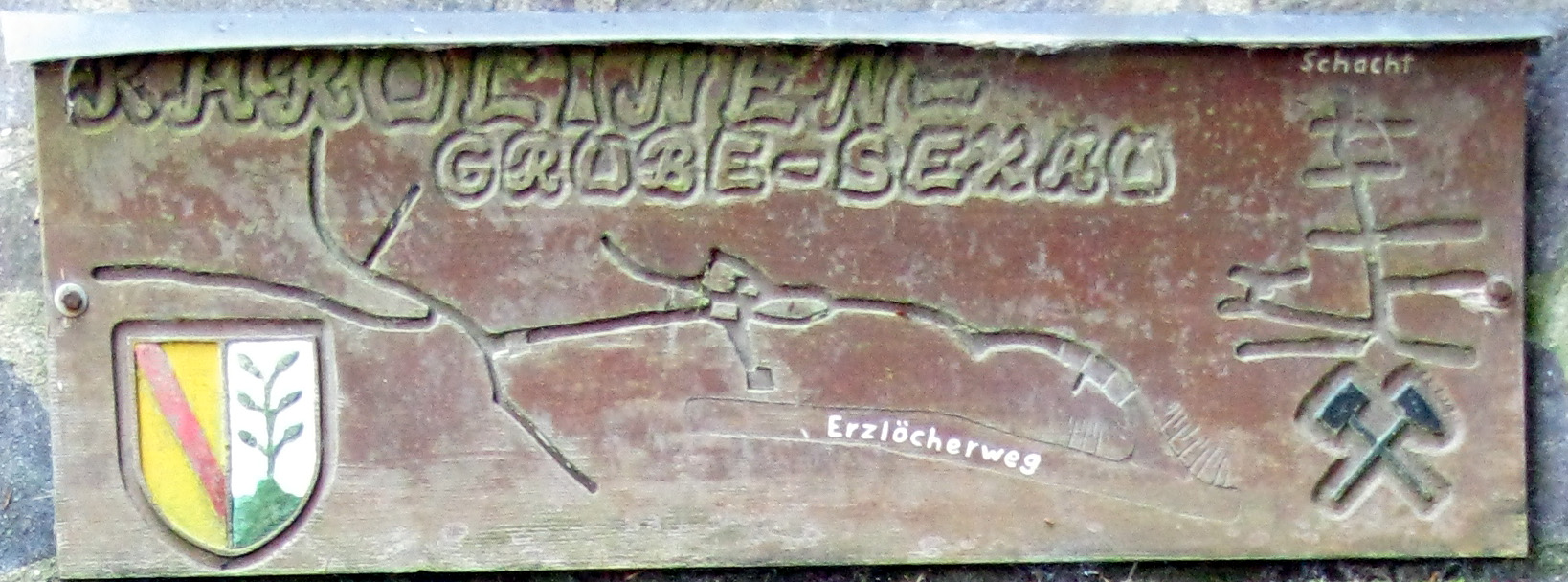
- Site plan
- Interactive map of Caroline Pit (Grube Caroline)

Location
- Location: Sexau, county of Emmendingen, Baden-Württemberg, Germany; 48°7′32.06″N 7°55′8.79″E

Production
- Products: Silver and lead
- Type: Show mine

History
- Opened: c. 12th century
- Active: to 1794

The Caroline Pit (German: Grube Caroline) in the Eberbächle, a side valley of the Brettenbach, is an old silver mine in Sexau in the Black Forest in Germany which is open to the public as a show mine. In 1987, volunteers began to uncover the pit and maintain it. It lies within the mining region of Sexau and Freiamt.

The oldest parts of the Caroline Pit date with some certainty to the 11th to 13th centuries, but these are the uppermost levels. There are no definite clues to older operation, for example in Roman times. The majority of the pit's buildings and structures, including the shafts and galleries date to the 16th century. Especially noteworthy is the original forging die on the sixth level of the mine which has survived with its wooden frame and winch supports; it has been dated dendrochronologically to 1528/30.

The last significant phase of operation took place between 1771 and 1794. The name of the mine also dates to this period: it is named after Caroline Louise of Hesse (1723–1783), the wife of the Margrave of Baden, Charles Frederick.

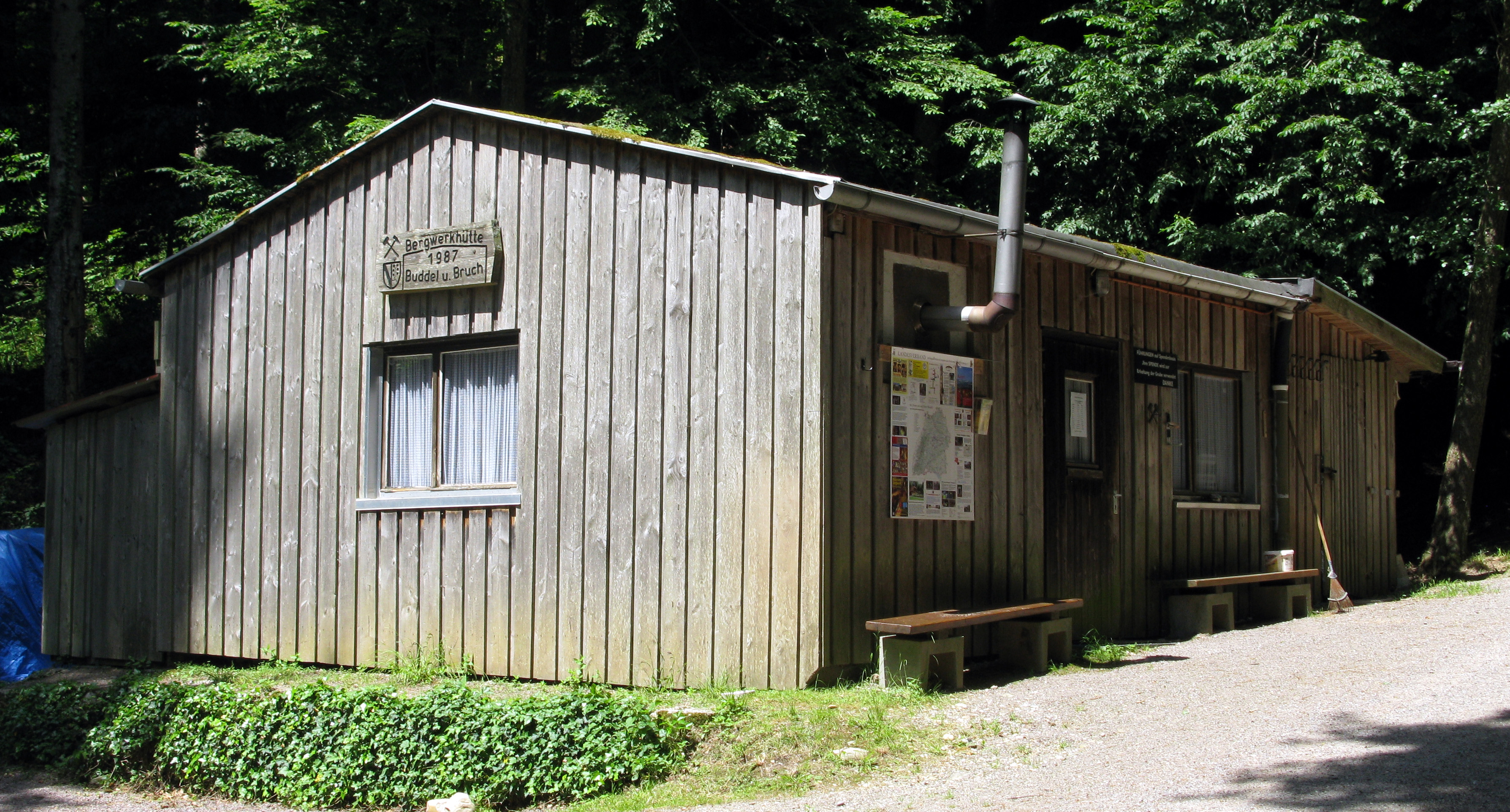
Smeltery

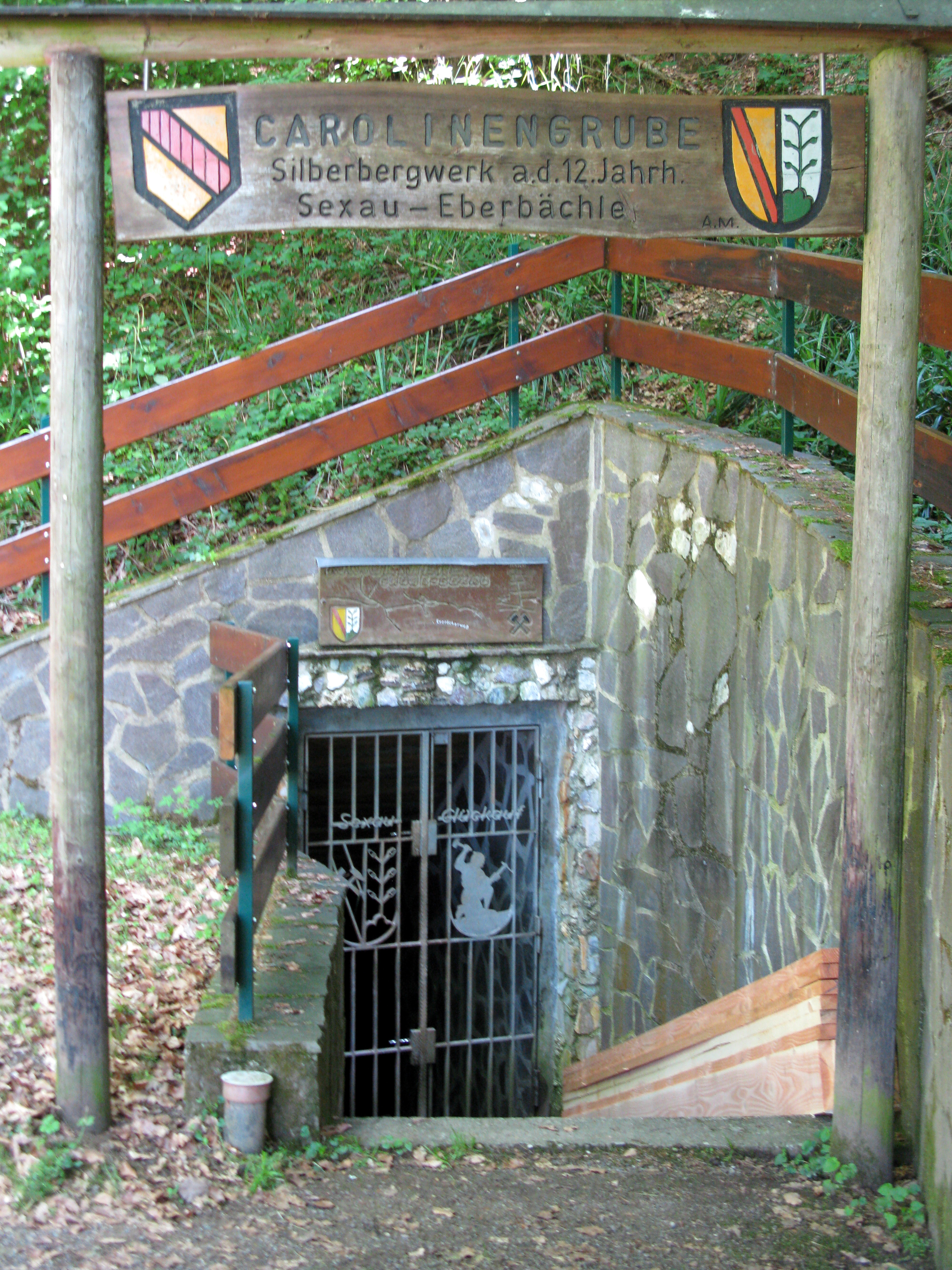
Entrance

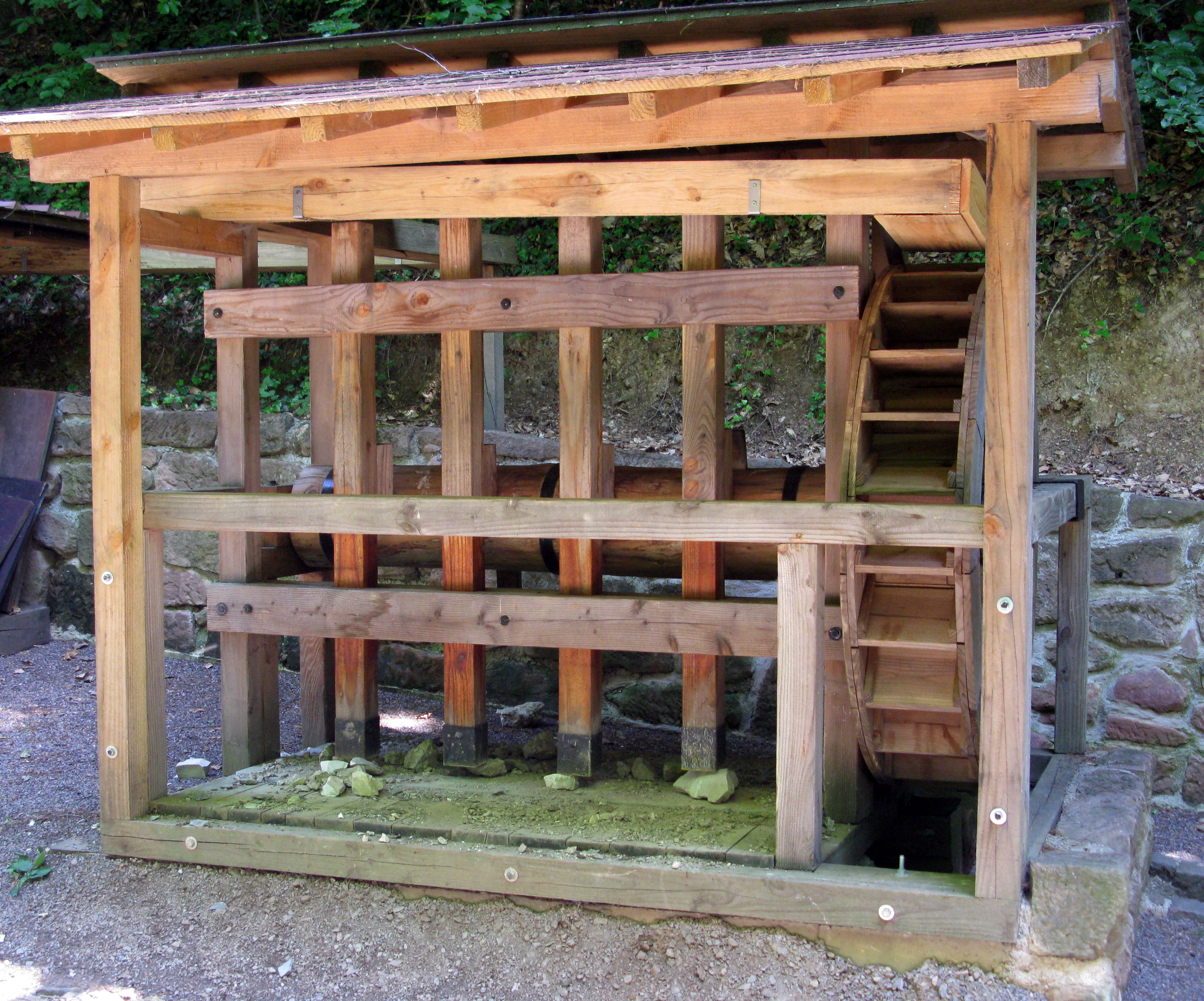
Replica stamp mill

== Literature ==
- Die Erz- und Mineralgänge im alten Bergbaurevier „Freiamt-Sexau“ (Mittlerer Schwarzwald) (Abhandlungen des Geologischen Landesamtes Baden-Württemberg 14), Freiburg i. Br., 1994.
- Wolfgang Werner, Volker Dennert: Lagerstätten und Bergbau im Schwarzwald. Herausgabe durch Landesamt für Geologie, Rohstoffe und Bergbau, Baden-Württemberg, Freiburg im Breisgau, 2004, ISBN 3-00-014636-9, pp. 219-230.
- Haasis-Berner, Andreas: Gold und Silber lieb' ich sehr... Die Geschichte des Bergbaus rund um den Kandel (Elz-, Glotter-, Simonswälder- und Brettenbachtal). Online
