= Riccardo Francovich =

Pioneering Italian archaeologist and expert

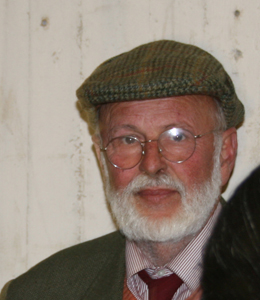
- Born: June 10, 1946; Florence, Italy
- Died: March 30, 2007 (aged 60); Fiesole, Italy

Riccardo Francovich (Florence, Italy, 10 June 1946 – Fiesole, Italy, 30 March 2007) was a pioneering Italian archaeologist and expert on medieval Italy.

The son of Carlo Francovich, Francovich was a professor of medieval archaeology first at the University of Florence and, then, from 1986 until his death in 2007, at the University of Siena. Many would consider him one of the most influential and important archaeologists of medieval Italy.

Francovich was a pioneer in the world of Italian archaeology. He trained himself in big-scale excavation. He was also one of the first archaeologists to utilize many British methods to his field practice. He was a skilled maker of archaeological parks. In this last task he experienced contrasting results. The park he made at Montarrenti never took off. On the other hand, the one at Rocca San Silvestro, known as the Parco Archeominerario di San Silvestro was a huge success. These experiences became the cornerstone of Francovich's career, turning his attention toward landscape architecture. He became a great supporter of local participation in site management.

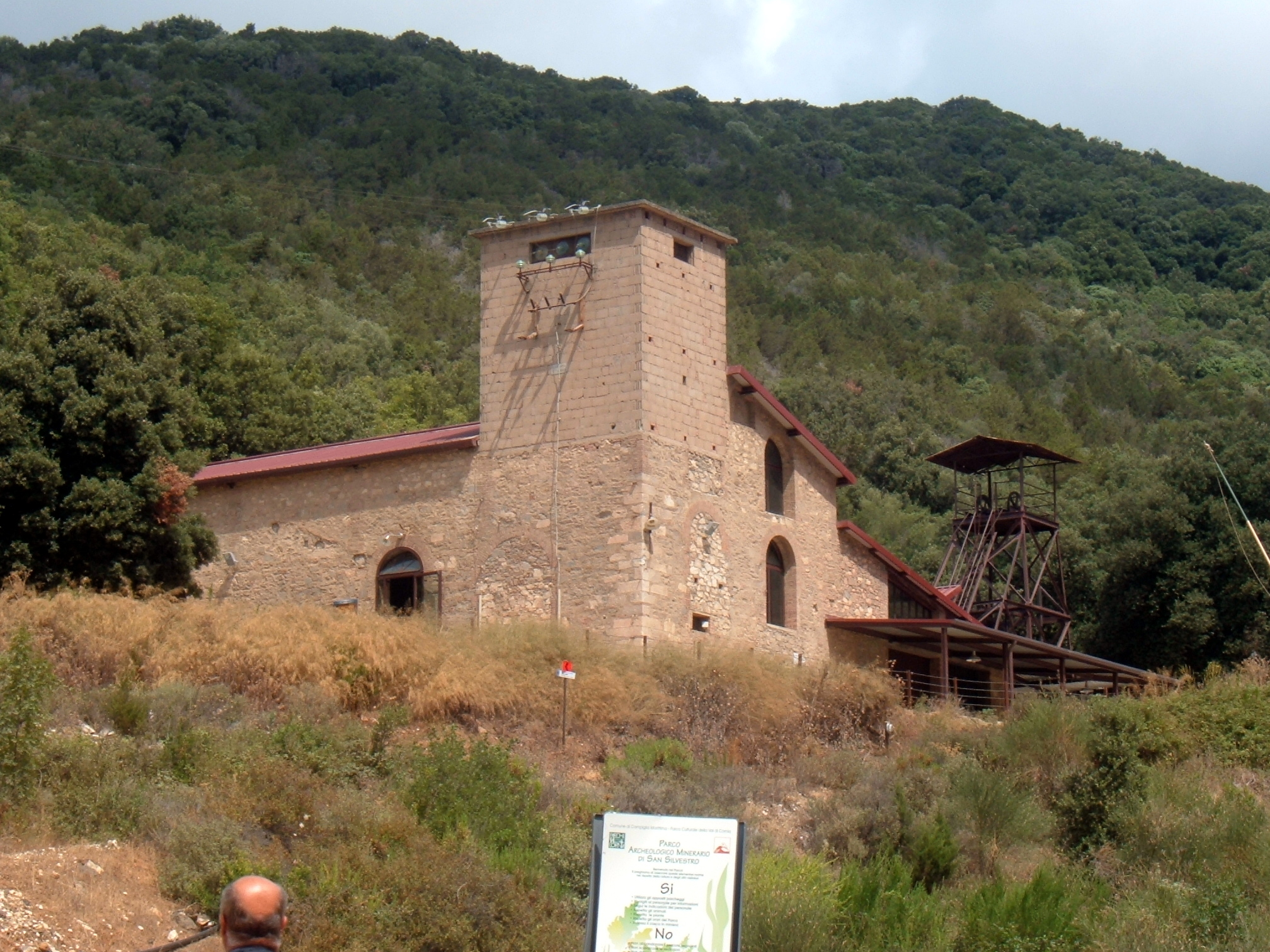
The Parco Archeominerario di San Silvestro.

Francovich's career as an archaeologist, with specialization in Medieval Archaeology in Italy, spanned nearly three decades. It was his research and excavations in Tuscany that led to it becoming the best-studied region of its kind in Europe.

He died in a fall from a height in the forest of Montececeri, near Fiesole.

== Works ==
- Riccardo Francovich, Daniele Manacorda, Dizionario di Archeologia, Editori Laterza, 2004.

== Sources ==
- Full bibliography [linkto:https://web.archive.org/web/20030920110908/http://www.archeo.unisi.it/francovich.html]
- https://web.archive.org/web/20070818185727/http://archeologiamedievale.unisi.it/NewPages/DOTT/riccardo1.html
- News coverage of Francovich's death: Corriere della Sera for 31 March 2007
