= Dorothea-Stolln =

Former underground mine in Germany

Coordinates: 50°33′30″N 13°00′06″E

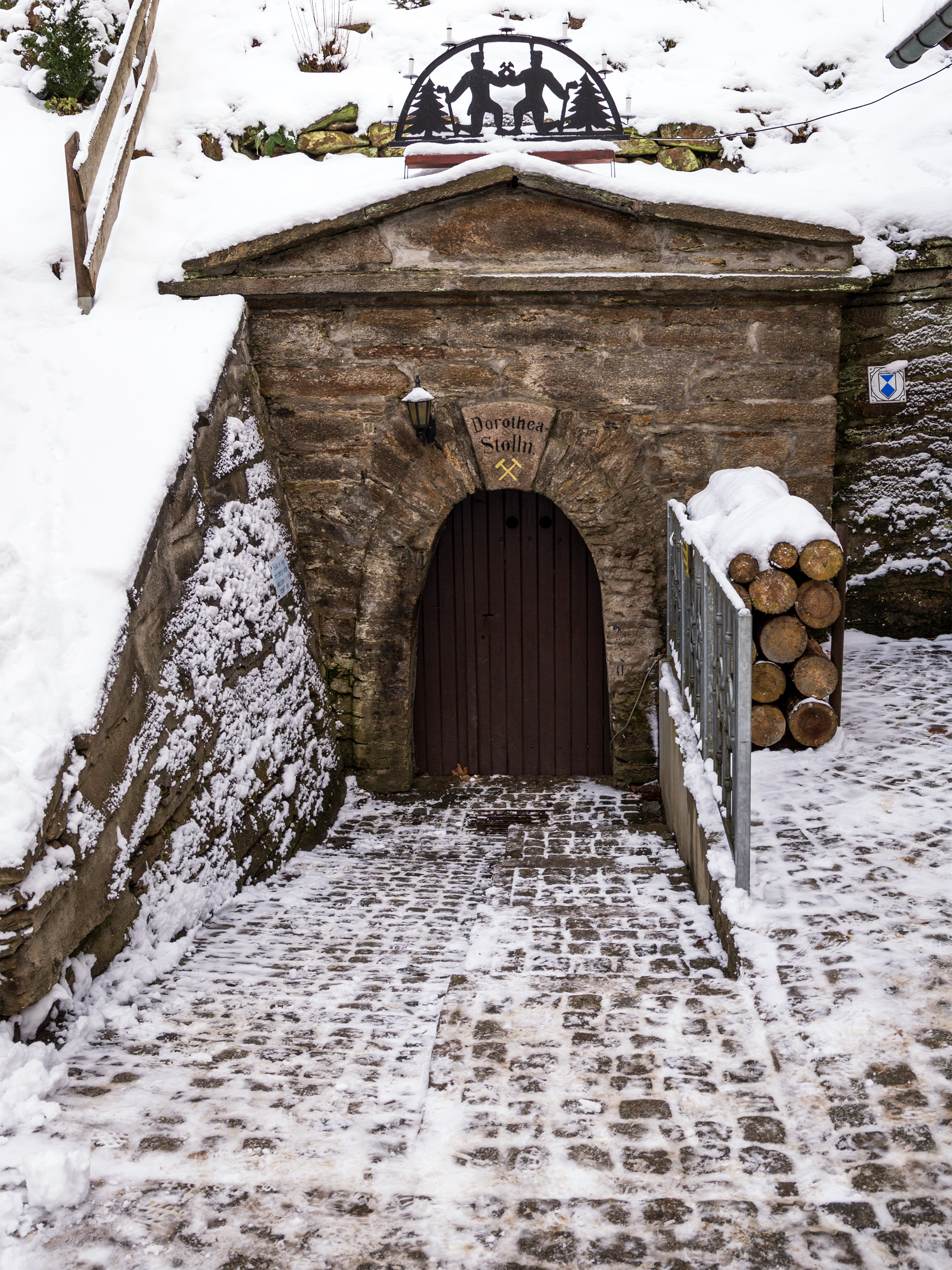
The main entrance of Dorothea-Stolln

The Dorothea-Stolln, also known as Himmlisch Heer Fundgrube Dorothea, is a former underground mine in Cunersdorf near Annaberg-Buchholz in Germany. Today, it is a visitor mine with a length of 53 km and a constant temperature of 8 °C. The Upper Saxon word Stolln means an adit, the German word Fundgrube was used to describe the pit that was the first to be awarded on a newly discovered field.

== History ==
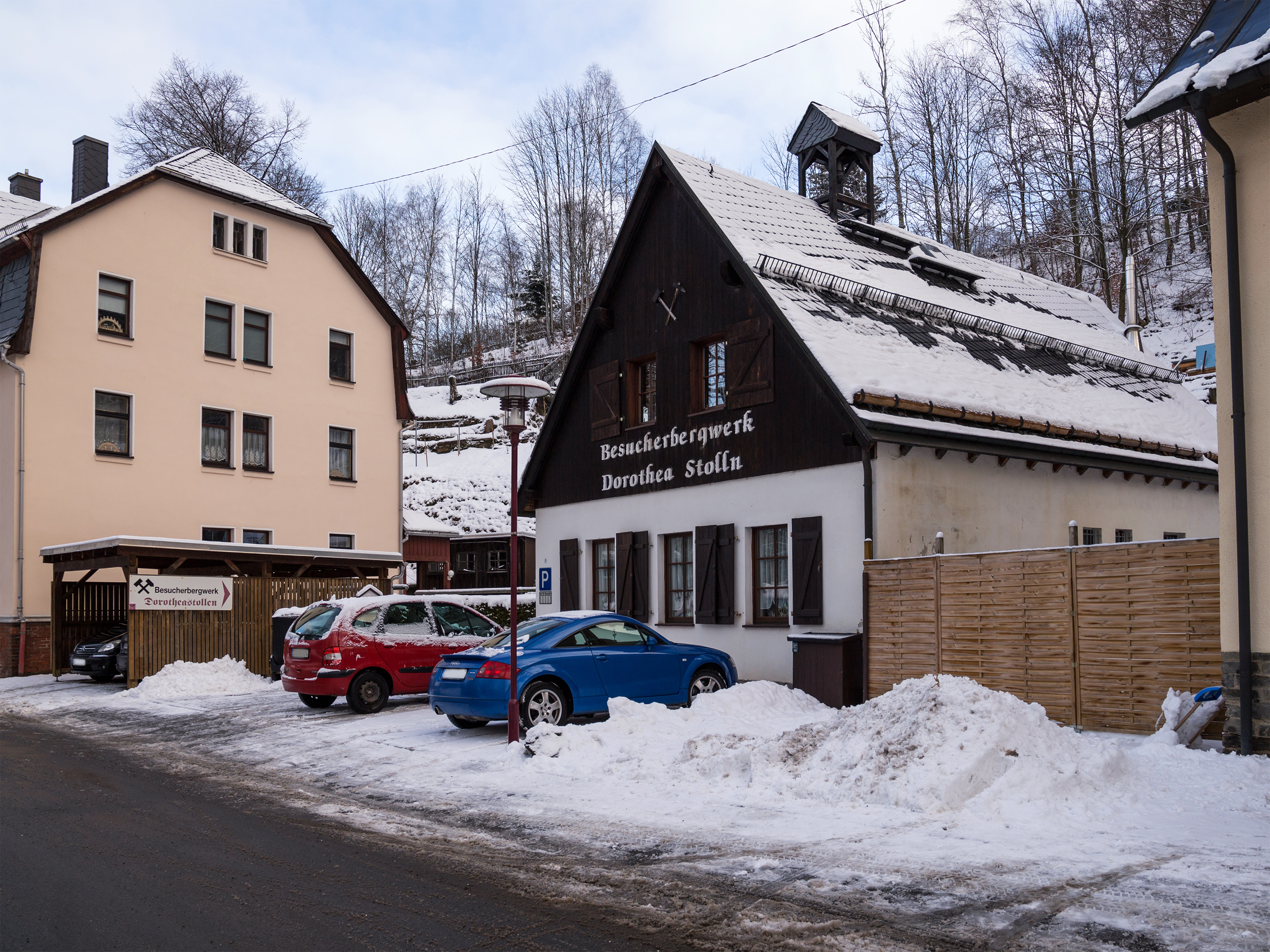
The former office building of the mine

In the 16th century, mining activities in Cunersdorf started. Due to the high yields, the mine quickly gained popularity. As of 1536, they earned 2409 Guldengroschen per Kux (non-material shares of a mine) in 2 and a quarter years. This was mainly due to a high concentration of silver (up to 40 %) in a lode. However, yields fell again in the following years. During the construction of an shaft, the year 1551 was discovered 125 m below the ground. The entrance that is still used today was constructed in 1853. The mining started with silver ore, later, also nickel, copper, uranium and cobalt ore was obtained. After World War II, in 1946/47, the SAG Wismut began searching for uranium in Annaberg-Buchholz, also in the Dorothea-Stolln. Uranium mining lasted only a short time and ended in 1958.

== Visitor mine ==
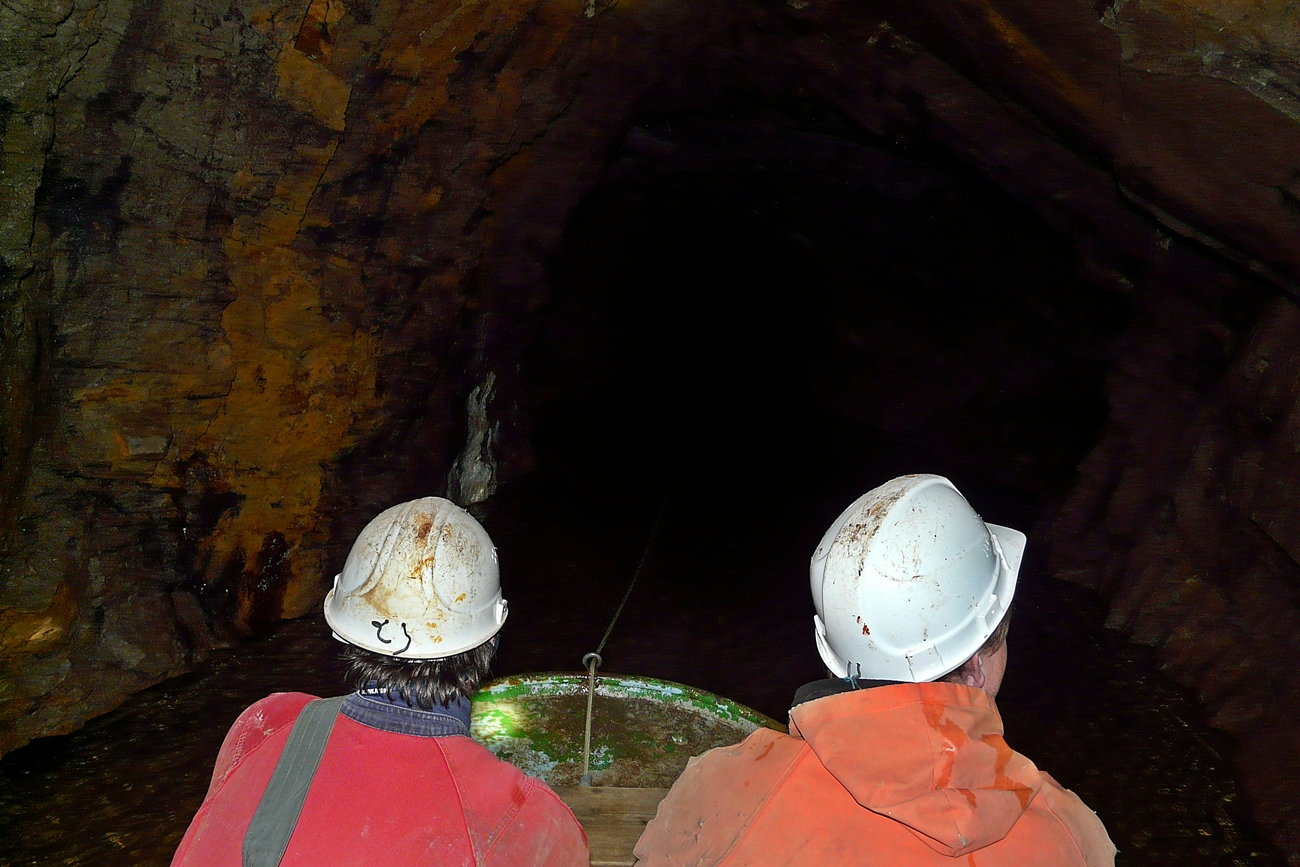
Boat ride in the mine

Since 1994, the Dorothea-Stolln can be visited. The visitor mine is operated by the association IG Altbergbau Dorotheastollen Cunersdorf e.V. A special feature is the guided tour with a boat ride, where visitors can travel a 250-meter route in the mine by boat.
