= Carlo Francovich =

Italian politician, partisan and literary historian

Carlo Francovich (16 June 1910 - 25 December 1990) was an Italian politician, partisan and literary historian.

== Life ==
He was born in Fiume or Gorizia, though after the First World War his family moved to Florence, where he attended secondary school. He graduated in literature from the University of Florence in 1934 alongside Guido Mazzoni and the following year began teaching in state schools.

In the meantime he joined the liberal-socialist movement and was one of the founder members of the Partito d'Azione (PdA). In February 1942 he, Tristano Codignola, Carlo Ludovico Ragghianti and Raffaello Ramat were arrested in Florence, but then took an active part in the Italian Resistance in the PdA's 'brigate Giustizia e Libertà' until Florence's liberation in August 1944.

He left the PdA in 1947 but maintained his liberal-socialist position and joined the 'Unità popolare' movement which eventually merged with the Italian Socialist Party in 1956. After obtaining a free teaching post in Risorgimento history, from 1954 to 1965 he was head of the "history of Afro-Asiatic countries" at the University of Siena, then of Risorgimento history at the Faculty of Education of the University of Florence from 1965 until retirement.

In 1953 he also became the director of the Istituto Storico della Resistenza in Toscana, then its president from 1975 to 1990, the year of his death, an institute modelled on the Istituto Nazionale per la Storia del Movimento di Liberazione in Italia, created in Ferruccio Parri by 1949 and based in Milan, with Francovich as its vice-president.

He died in Florence. His son was the noted medieval archaeologist Riccardo Francovich, who also taught in Florence and Siena, whilst Carlo's wife Nicoletta Francovich Onesti (1943–2014) taught German philology at Siena.

== Personal library and archive ==
The Biblioteca di Scienze sociali at the University of Florence has a Fondo Carlo Francovich, made up of a collection of books, reviews, comprendente una raccolta di libri, riviste, pamphlets and other material on the Napoleonic era, secret societies and the Risorgimento. Random discoveries among the Fondo's books and later systematic examination as the discovered pages and books were catalogued, led to the formation of a collection, containing (for example) Francovich's private correspondence with scholars on issues and topics centred around Freemasonry and secret societies in the 18th and 19th centuries, various notes, editorial publicity material, invitations and letters of thanks from publishers.

He also donated another archive on the Italian Resistance and his studies of that period to the Istituto Storico Toscano della Resistenza e dell'Età contemporanea.

== Other writings ==
- Fonte lucente. Antologia italiana per la scuola media (with W. Ramat Pieroni), F. Perrella, Roma, 1949.
- Filippo Buonarroti e la società dei "Veri Italiani", La Nuova Italia, Firenze, 1951.
- La "marsigliese" degli italiani, La Nuova Italia, Firenze, 1952.
- La rivoluzione americana e il progetto di costituzione del granduca Pietro Leopoldo, Istituto Poligrafico dello Stato, Roma, 1954.
- La stampa a Firenze dall'armistizio alla liberazione, La Nuova Italia, Firenze, 1956.
- Funzioni e scopi dell'Istituto storico della Resistenza, ISR, Firenze, 1958.
- La Resistenza a Firenze, La Nuova Italia, Firenze, 1961.
- Un caso ancora controverso: chi uccise Giovanni Gentile?, ISR, Firenze, 1961.
- Dalla marcia su Roma alle leggi eccezionali: corso di 6 lezioni sulla storia italiana degli ultimi 30 anni, Cooptip, Modena, 1961.
- L'azione rivoluzionaria risorgimentale e i movimenti delle nazionalità in Europa prima del 1848, Marzorati, Milano, 1962.
- Albori socialisti nel Risorgimento. Contributo allo studio delle società segrete (1776-1835), Le Monnier, Firenze, 1962.
- La Resistenza in Toscana, Unione Regionale delle Provincie Toscane, Firenze, 1962.
- Le società segrete in Toscana dalla Massoneria alla Giovane Italia, Leo S. Olschki, Firenze, 1964.
- La resistenza e il console tedesco: Firenze 1943-1944, La Nuova Italia, Firenze, 1967.
- I giorni della libertà: l'aprile del '45 (with L. Di Benedetto), La Nuova Italia, Firenze, 1969.
- La Lombardia nel 1848 (with A. Piccioni), La Nuova Italia, Firenze, 1970.
- L'insorgenza nazionale nell'Impero napoleonico, Giardini, Pisa, 1981.
- L'illuminismo lombardo e la massoneria, Il Mulino, Bologna, 1982.
- Garibaldi in Toscana tra il 1847 ed il 1949, Leo S. Olschki, Firenze, 1984.
- Il movimento filoellenico in Italia e in Europa, Leo S. Olschki, Firenze, 1987.
- Storia della Massoneria in Italia, dalle origini alla Rivoluzione francese, La Nuova Italia, Firenze, 1989, Nuova ed.: Milano, Ghibli, 2013 ISBN 9788868010744.
- Istituzioni e ideologia in Italia e in Germania tra le rivoluzioni, Il Mulino, Bologna, 1997.

== Bibliography ==
- (in Italian) Zeffiro Ciuffoletti, "Carlo Francovich e la storia come impegno civile e come passione di ricerca", Archivio Storico Italiano, Vol. 149, No. 4 (550) (October–December 1991) pp. 971–975.
- (in Italian) Giorgio Vaccarino, "Carlo Francovich 1910-1990", Italia Contemporanea, 182 (1991) pp. 177–179.
