= Rohrmoos-Untertal =

- Former municipality
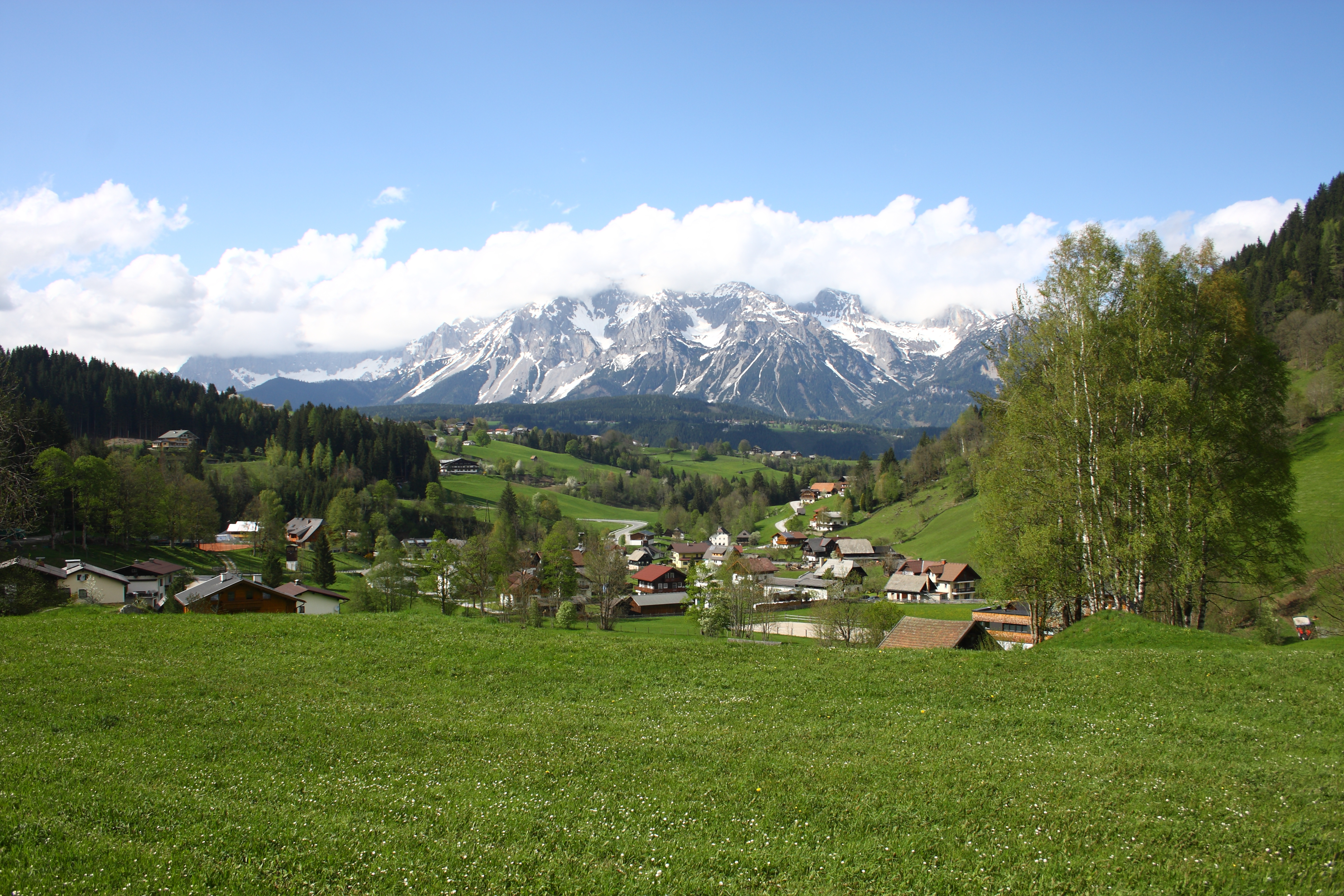
- View of Rohrmoos-Untertal

- Coat of arms

- Location within Austria
- Coordinates: 47°23′00″N 13°40′00″E
- Country: Austria
- State: Styria
- District: Liezen

Area
  - Total: 146.34 km^{2} (56.50 sq mi)
- Elevation: 900 m (3,000 ft)

Population (1 January 2016)
  - Total: 1,376
  - Density: 9.403/km^{2} (24.35/sq mi)
- Time zone: UTC+1 (CET)
  - Summer (DST): UTC+2 (CEST)
- Postal code: 8971
- Area code: 03687
- Vehicle registration: GB
- Website: www.rohrmoos.co.at

Rohrmoos-Untertal is a former municipality in the district of Liezen in Styria, Austria. Since the 2015 Styria municipal structural reform, it is part of the municipality Schladming.

== Mining (historic) ==
In the mountains to the south of the municipality (Zinkwand, Vetternspitze), mining was carried out, mainly for silver, nickel and zinc.

(Mining from the early Middle Ages to the 19th century; see at List of show mines)

== Climate ==
Climate data for Rohrmoos: 1075m (3527ft) (1981−2010 normals, extremes 1971−2010)
Month	Jan	Feb	Mar	Apr	May	Jun	Jul	Aug	Sep	Oct	Nov	Dec	Year
Record high °C (°F)	13.7 (56.7)	14.2 (57.6)	20.1 (68.2)	23.0 (73.4)	27.5 (81.5)	30.2 (86.4)	32.7 (90.9)	31.2 (88.2)	26.2 (79.2)	22.2 (72.0)	18.4 (65.1)	14.0 (57.2)	32.7 (90.9)
Mean daily maximum °C (°F)	0.6 (33.1)	1.8 (35.2)	5.8 (42.4)	10.5 (50.9)	16.3 (61.3)	19.1 (66.4)	21.2 (70.2)	20.3 (68.5)	16.2 (61.2)	11.6 (52.9)	4.7 (40.5)	1.1 (34.0)	10.8 (51.4)
Daily mean °C (°F)	−3.7 (25.3)	−3.0 (26.6)	0.6 (33.1)	4.7 (40.5)	10.1 (50.2)	13.1 (55.6)	15.1 (59.2)	14.4 (57.9)	10.5 (50.9)	6.2 (43.2)	0.5 (32.9)	−2.8 (27.0)	5.5 (41.9)
Mean daily minimum °C (°F)	−6.9 (19.6)	−6.5 (20.3)	−3.2 (26.2)	0.3 (32.5)	4.9 (40.8)	8.0 (46.4)	10.0 (50.0)	9.9 (49.8)	6.5 (43.7)	2.6 (36.7)	−2.4 (27.7)	−5.7 (21.7)	1.5 (34.6)
Record low °C (°F)	−24.8 (−12.6)	−20.3 (−4.5)	−21.1 (−6.0)	−10.4 (13.3)	−10.2 (13.6)	−2.0 (28.4)	0.3 (32.5)	1.6 (34.9)	−2.3 (27.9)	−11.5 (11.3)	−17.2 (1.0)	−20.8 (−5.4)	−24.8 (−12.6)
Average precipitation mm (inches)	73 (2.9)	62 (2.4)	79 (3.1)	61 (2.4)	93 (3.7)	131 (5.2)	148 (5.8)	146 (5.7)	103 (4.1)	72 (2.8)	73 (2.9)	74 (2.9)	1,115 (43.9)
Average snowfall cm (inches)	85 (33)	76 (30)	68 (27)	27 (11)	4 (1.6)	0 (0)	0 (0)	0 (0)	0 (0)	9 (3.5)	48 (19)	77 (30)	394 (155.1)
Source: Central Institute for Meteorology and Geodynamics
