= Parco Archeominerario di San Silvestro =

Coordinates: 43.087°N 10.605°E

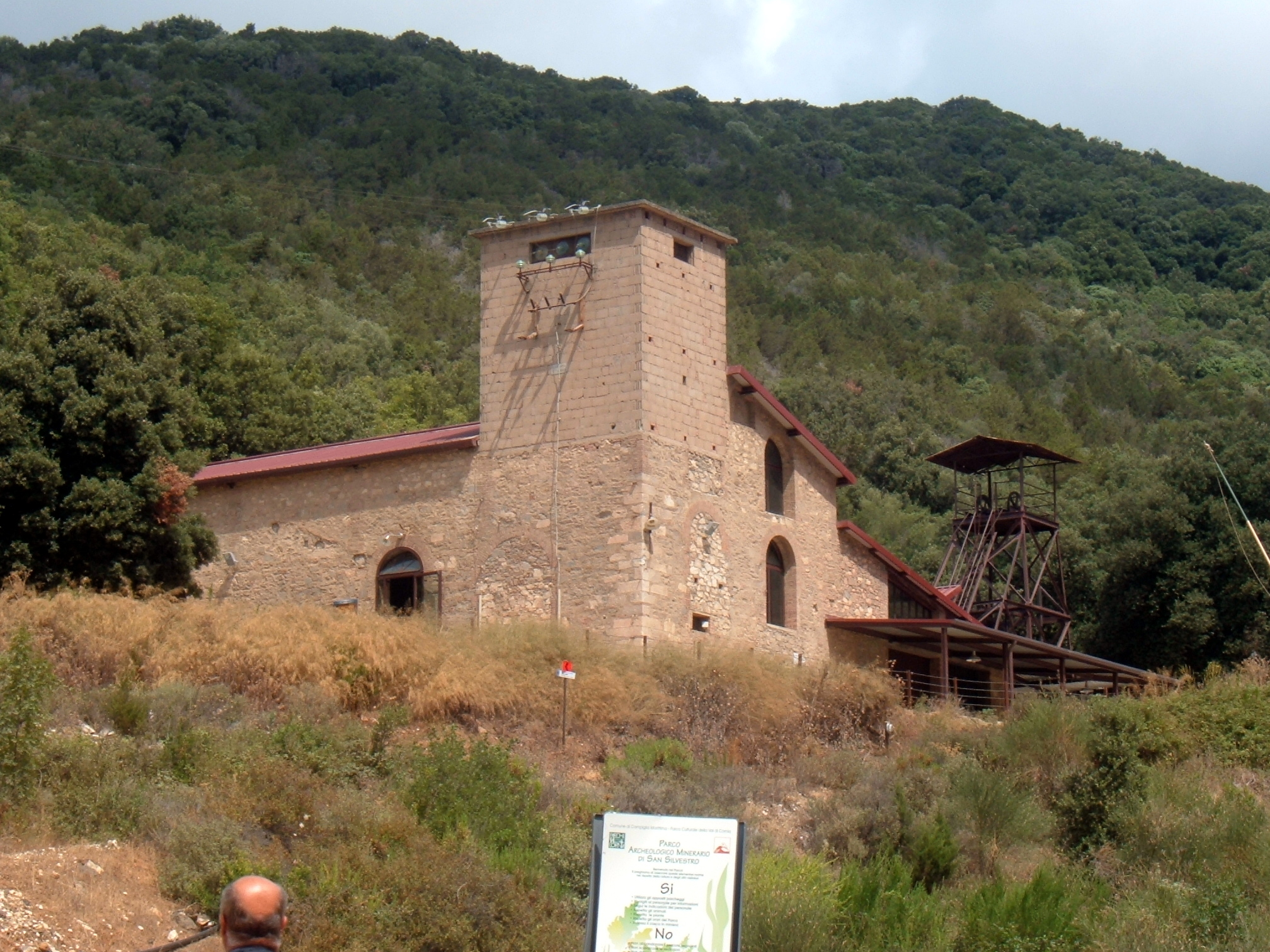
Parco archeominerario di San Silvestro: Museum of mining machinery.

The Parco archeominerario di San Silvestro (Archaeological Mines Park of San Silvestro) is a park in Campiglia Marittima, Tuscany, Italy. It was created following the excavation of the castle of Rocca San Silvestro, a protected natural area of local interest of the Tuscany region established in 1995. It is part of the Val di Cornia parks.

The park's features include:

- Miner's Museum
- Museum of Archaeology and Minerals
- Museum of Mining Machinery
- Temperino Mine
- Gallery Lanzi-Temperino
- Rocca di San Silvestro
