= Sexau =

- Municipality
- Coat of arms

- Location of Sexau within Emmendingen district
- Interactive map of Sexau
- Location within Germany Location within Baden-Württemberg
- Coordinates: 48°06′11″N 07°54′33″E
- Country: Germany
- State: Baden-Württemberg
- Admin. region: Freiburg
- District: Emmendingen

Government
  - Mayor (2017–25): Michael Goby

Area
  - Total: 16.30 km^{2} (6.29 sq mi)
- Elevation: 232 m (761 ft)

Population (2025-12-31)
  - Total: 3,593
  - Density: 220.4/km^{2} (570.9/sq mi)
- Time zone: UTC+01:00 (CET)
  - Summer (DST): UTC+02:00 (CEST)
- Postal codes: 79350
- Dialling codes: 07641
- Vehicle registration: EM
- Website: www.sexau.de

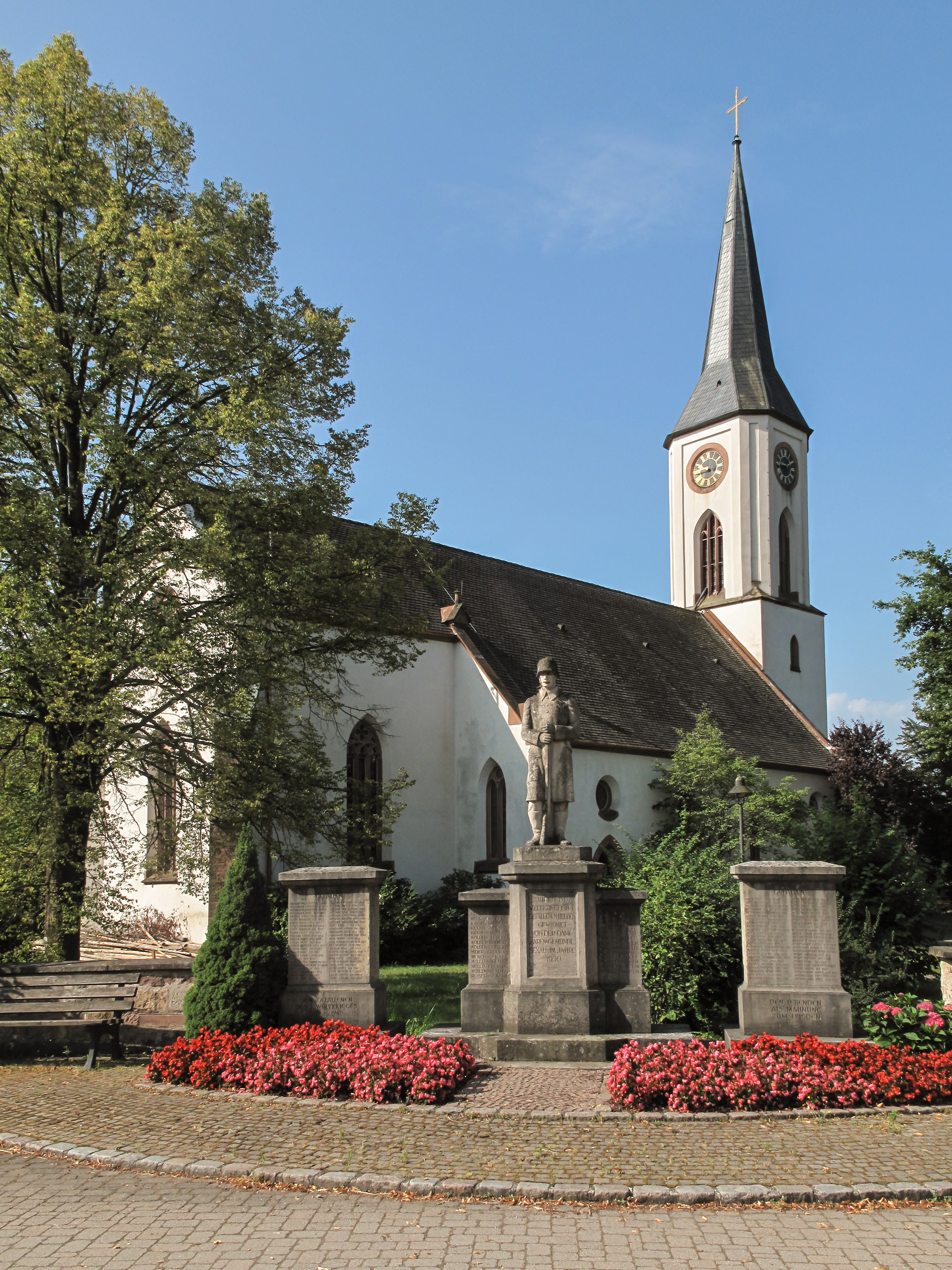
Sexau, church: die Dorfkirche

Sexau (Low Alemannic: Säxoi) is a village in the district of Emmendingen in Baden-Württemberg in Germany.

== Geography ==
Sexau is at the beginning of the valley "Brettenbachtal". It is located on the crossing from the region of the Black Forest ("Schwarzwald") to the plains of the river Rhein ("Rheinebene").

== Mayor ==
Michael Goby was elected mayor for the first time in 2001. He was reelected in March 2009.
