= Show mine =

Mine that is accessible to visitors

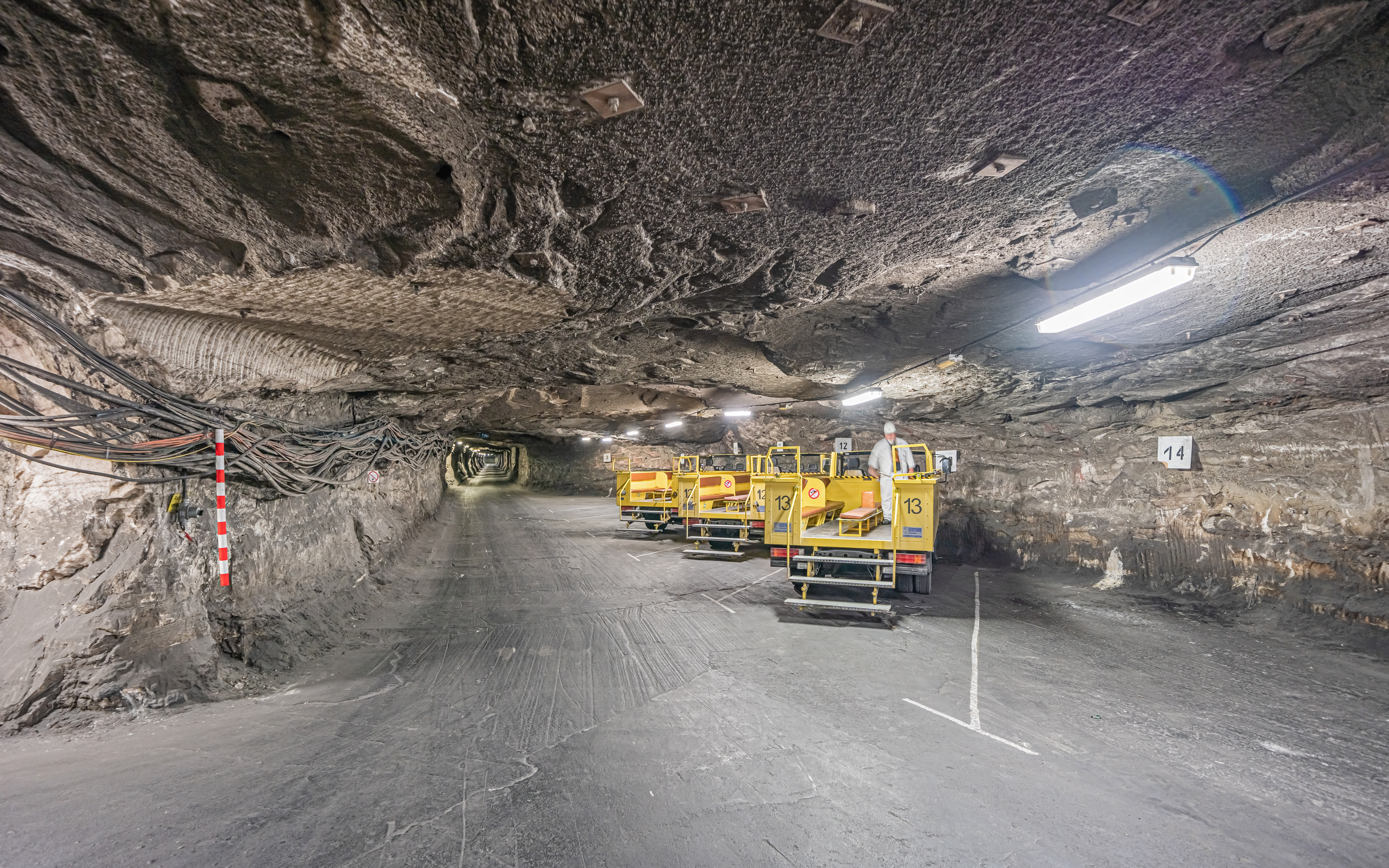
Merkers Adventure Mines with touring trucks

A show mine is a mine that is accessible to visitors.

A mine, i.e. an industrial facility for the underground extraction of mineral products, has three operating phases: it may be open or running, or closed or it may be a working museum. Most mines are simply closed once they are no longer productive. For safety they are usually partially destroyed (filled in). However, many mines are at least partially accessible today to visitors.

In such cases they may be referred to as show mines or visitor mines if the focus is mainly on visiting the former mine, or mining museums if the mine only forms part of a museum. Most show mines have been set up in abandoned mines. In recent decades, however, they are often established immediately after mining ceases, creating some jobs funded at least partially by cultural tourism.

== Overview ==
Fireman practising the rescue of an injured group of visitors in the Fell Visitor Mine

A show mine is often just a small part of a much larger mining facility that is developed, secured and provided with educational exhibits and installations. Such mines are usually equipped with fixed electrical lighting, which rarely existed in earlier mining operations. A few mines offer more authentic guided tours, by not using electric lights and equipping visitors instead with miners' lamps. In Germany and Austria, the respective mining offices are entrusted with the supervision of the show mines within their areas of responsibility. This specifically includes the observance of safety. For example, show mines must have a second exit and the fire service responsible must agree to practise the rescue of accident victims from the mine at regular intervals.

Preserved pit railways, needed to reach mining works deep within a mountain, are especially popular. A few visitor mines still have working winders that transport visitors down into the mine. They are also an important element of the mining industry, without which a portrayal of the technology would be incomplete. In addition, the ride for young and old is an experience that often represents an additional highlight of their visit.

There are show mines in many nations around the world, but they are of course particularly common in industrialized nations. The longer a country's mining history, the more interesting are its abandoned mines. In Germany there are more than 100 such show mines, but many may only be visited on Sundays or by appointment. In Austria there are just over 30 visitor mines. Some of these mines have been closed in recent years, because they no longer meet significantly higher safety standards introduced after the Lassing mining disaster. Examples include the Arthur Gallery (Arthurstollen) and the shale oil mine in Pertisau.

Many show mines have only been established for the purpose of demonstration, without ever having served for extraction of mineral resources. These include the Mining Museum in Bochum, the Barbara Gallery at the University of Cologne and the so-called German Slate Mine in Mayen.

== See also ==
- Show cave
