= Dietz =

Dietz is a surname, and may refer to:

- Albrecht Dietz (1926–2012), German entrepreneur and scientist
- August Dietz (1869–1963), a philatelist, editor and publisher
- Bernard Dietz (born 1948), German football player and manager
- Cyrus E. Dietz (1876–1929), Illinois Supreme Court Justice
- Damion Dietz (born 1971), American film writer/director
- Dick Dietz (1941–2005), American baseball player
- Ella Dietz (1847-1920), American actress and author
- Feodor Dietz (1813–1870), German painter
- G. O. Dietz, American football coach and lawyer
- George P. Dietz, German-born American neo-Nazi publisher.
- Hendrik Casimir II of Nassau-Dietz
- Henry A. Dietz, American professor and author
- Howard Dietz (1896–1983), American lyric writer and librettist
- Jan Dietz (born 1945), Dutch computer scientist
- Jim Dietz (disambiguation), several people
- Johann Heinrich Wilhelm Dietz (1843–1922), German politician
- Maria Dietz (1894–1980), German politician
- Michaela Dietz (born 1982), American actress
- Michael Dietz (born 1971), American actor
- Park Dietz (born 1948), American forensic psychiatrist
- Richard Dietz (born 1977), North Carolina Supreme Court Justice
- Robert H. Dietz (1921–1945), United States Army soldier and a recipient of the Medal of Honor
- Robert S. Dietz (1914–1995), US-American geophysicist and oceanographer
- Sophie Dietz (1820–1887), German operatic soprano
- Sterling Dietz (born 1991), American magician
- Steven Dietz, American playwright
- Thomas Dietz (juggler) (born 1982), German professional juggler
- Thomas Dietz (politician) (born 1967), German politician
- William Dietz (disambiguation), several people

== Other ==
Dietz may also refer to:

- R. E. Dietz Company, a lighting and lantern manufacturer

== See also ==
- Diez (disambiguation)
