= Diez (surname) =

Diez or Díez is a surname. Notable people with the surname include:

- Alfredo Diez Nieto (1918–2021) Cuban composer, conductor and professor
- Barbarito Díez (1909–1995), Cuban singer
- Benni Diez, German filmmaker
- Diego Díez Ferreras (d. 1697), Spanish artist
- Eduardo Díez de Medina, Bolivian politician
- Emiliano Díez, Cuban actor
- Ernst Friedrich Diez, German opera singer
- Fabio Díez, Argentinian-Spanish beach volleyball player
- Federico Díez de Medina, Bolivian politician
- Friedrich Christian Diez (1794–1876), German philologist
- Fritz Diez, East German actor and theater director.
- Heinrich Friedrich von Diez, German diplomat and orientalist
- Javier Diez Canseco (1948–2013), Peruvian politician
- Juan Martín Díez (1775–1825), Spanish guerrilla leader
- Luis Díez del Corral, Spanish lawyer and political scientist
- Margarita of Diez, German noblewoman
- Margarita Diez-Colunje y Pombo (1838–1919), Colombian historian, translator, genealogist
- Mauricio González-Gordon y Díez (1928–2013), Spanish sherry maker and conservationist
- Nicolás Diez, Argentine footballer
- Ricardo Gómez Diez, Argentine politician
- Samuel Friedrich Diez, German painter
- Sophie Diez (1820–1887), German operatic soprano
- Stefan Diez (born 1971), German designer
- Steven Diez, Spanish/Canadian tennis player
- Thomas Diez, German professor of International Relations
- Blessed Victoria Díez Bustos de Molina (1903–1936), Spanish teacher and religious woman
- Wilhelm von Diez, German painter

== See also ==
- Dietz
