= Tiere bis unters Dach =

German television series

- Created by: Sebastian Andrae
- Theme music composer: Biber Gullatz
- Country of origin: Germany
- No. of seasons: 10
- No. of episodes: 120+

Production
- Running time: 28–33 minutes
- Production company: Polyphon Südwest GmbH

Original release
- Network: ARD; SWR Fernsehen; KiKa
- Release: January 16, 2010 – present

Tiere bis unters Dach is a German family television series. As of October 2023, it consists of 117 episodes across nine seasons and is produced by regional German television channel SWR Fernsehen for the national broadcaster organization ARD (broadcaster). The first episode aired on January 16, 2010. The ninth season was aired from May 8 to June 26 of 2022.

== Plot ==
=== Synopsis ===
Greta Hansen and her family move from Hamburg to a small village in the Black Forest, where her father opens up a veterinary clinic. Greta soon makes friends and they start rescuing animals together. In season 3, the focus shifts from Greta to her cousin Nelly who takes over Greta's mission to help animals. Over the course of the show many new characters and storylines are introduced and the focus shifts away from the Hansen family. As of season 10 none the original main cast of the Hansen family remain.

=== Season 1 ===
Greta Hansen and her family move from the city of Hamburg to an old and dilapidated villa in the village of Waldau in the Black Forest. The Hansen family consists of father Philip, who opens his first veterinary clinic within the house, mother Annette, who works to restore the villa, Greta's little sister Lilie, the family dog Brezel, and many other animals. While seven-year-old Lilie quickly settles in her new surrounding, Philip and Annette struggle to find patients and friends. Greta herself has a hard time adjusting to her new life at first, but soon meets Jonas Grieshaber and becomes friends with him. Jonas is living on a farm with his parents Josefine and Vinzenz, the mayor and resident hunter of Waldau, as well as with his older brother Jakob. Jonas' family owns cattle and a dog named Oswald.

Greta joins Jonas in school, their teacher being Frau Heidelbach. Here she meets Celine, who soon becomes Greta's best friend, Cem, and Luka, who is Jonas' best friend. She also meets mean girl Emma, a Russian girl named Natalia and the social outcast Paul. The kids soon form a friend group and experience many adventures together. These adventures have all one thing in common: rescuing animals. Greta is a great animal lover and unfailingly keeps supporting their needs and interests, against all odds and obstacles. The family is regularly visited by Grandma Almut, Annette's mother, who is loved by the kids and labelled "invasive" by the parents. Finally, Greta and her family manage to fully settle in their new life.

=== Season 2 ===
Greta graduates to secondary school, while her little sister Lilie attends her first year in elementary school. As Waldau does not have a secondary school, Greta and her friends have to attend school in a neighboring town. While Luka is not joining the group at the new school, the meet Sophie and Timo who quickly close friends with them. Their new teacher is Frau Haller. Lilie meets Celine's little sister Lucie and befriends her. Philip is still looking for a veterinary assistant and finds one in Bertie Heckenbichler, who previously worked at a riding stable. Annette creates her own little atelier.

Jonas' parents fight a lot, as Josefine is renting out Jakob's room to holiday guests, and Vinzenz secretly purchases nandus. After Vinzenz ignores Josefine's worries about her parents, Josefine moves out and decides to live with her parents for the time being. Jonas is overwhelmed with the idea of his parents separating permanently, while Vinzenz realises his mistake and begins to fight for the relationship. Finally, he decides to sell the birds and Josefine moves back in.

=== Season 3 ===
Susanne, Annette's sister, moves in with her daughter Nelly and their dog Cookie, after she quit her job as an architect and lost her apartment. Greta and Jonas bestow Nelly with their mission to save animals, feeling too grown themselves to continue.

A polish family named Kulka moves in with the Grieshaber family to work as guest workers at their farm. The family consists of father Tomasz, mother Maria, son Pawel, who is Nelly's age, and the youngest daughter Paulina. Nelly and Pawel are attending school in the homeroom of Frau Ott. Her son Gustav a technology nerd, bully Ben "Big Ben" Armbruster, and mean girls Constanze and Kim also attend their homeroom. Nelly, Pawel and Gustav become friends and find a hut in the forest, which they renovate, name "Eulennest" (German: "Owl Nest") and use as a secret hideout for their animal rescue adventures.

All the while, Susanne is looking for a new job and finds something in a neighboring town. Philip receives a job offer from his old professor, asking him to lead the veterinary clinic in Hamburg as deputy chief doctor. As the professor visits him, Philip decides to stay in Waldau. Maria's father back in Poland has an accident, causing Maria and Tomasz to return home, leaving Pawel and Paulina in the care of the Grieshaber family. Annette is unhappy with Vinzenz's politics and decides to run against him in the next election. Annette wins and becomes Waldau's new mayor.

=== Season 4 ===
Greta and Jonas become romantically involved. Susanne receives a job offer from Dubai and desperately wants to accept. Nelly, however, is shocked and refuses to leave Waldau and her friends. Susanne decides to leave for Dubai alone, leaving her daughter with the Hansen family. A new student named Jessie joins Nelly's homeroom. While most kids seem to take to her quickly, Nelly and Jessie start off on the wrong foot, after Brezel the dog was accused to have bitten a kid, even though it was Jessie's dog Iwan. After setting aside their differences the two girls become best friends.Maria and Tomasz return from Poland and are expecting their third child, Kasimir. Greta begs her parents to go on an exchange year to the USA and after some discussion Annette and Philip allow her to go. Jonas also is not happy with Greta's choice to leave. Before Greta leaves on her exchange a big goodbye party is thrown, inviting Greta's friends and Grandma Almut. But Almut never arrives in Waldau since she fell off a ladder back home and now lies in an induced coma. Hearing the news Greta delays her departure and Annette and Philip go to Hamburg to see Almut.

=== Season 5 ===
While Annette and Philip are in Hamburg, Josefine is taking care of Greta, Lilie and Nelly. Greta delayed her exchange year until further notice. When Philip returns to Waldau, Josefine continues to help him out, which prompts Lilie to assume they started an affair. This turns out to be false. Grandma Almut wakes up from her coma but Annette decides to stay with her in Hamburg. Annette starts getting involved with Almut's doctor. Since Annette decided to stay in Hamburg, Vinzenz is reinstated as mayor. Greta falls for the equestrian Luis and has a hard time breaking up with Jonas, until Jonas catches them kissing. Jonas and Greta break up and she gets together with Luis. Dominik has to repeat a year of school and is introduced into Nelly's homeroom, Gustav left the school and is attending a boarding school for gifted kids. Bertie decides to move to France with his girlfriend Hanne and Philip is in need of a new assistant. Nelly and Jessie convince him to hire Isa, Jessie's mother, for the job. Jessie meets her grandfather for the first time in years, but Isa is not happy to see her father. Jessie decides to reconcile her mother and grandfather, who had a fallout due to Isa's romantic endeavours. As Jessie's grandfather collapses in Philip's clinic, Isa decides to bury her grudge and make up with her father. Ever since Annette's decision to stay in Hamburg, Nelly feels more and more like an outsider in the Hansen family until one day her father Jobst shows up unannounced. Jobst left Susanne when Nelly was still an infant. While Nelly seems to be excited to meet him and plans to visit him in Bremen, the rest of the family is not happy about his appearance. Susanne returns and talks to Jobst, resolving their issues. Greta finally starts her exchange year.

=== Season 6 ===
After a water leak, Philip, Lilie, and Nelly have to leave the house and are taken in by the Grieshaber family. Annette and Philip are separated and Lilie decides to move back to Hamburg to her mother. Jessie and Pawel are a couple but aren't sure how to tell Nelly. Nelly finds out on her own and is disappointed in her friends for keeping the truth from her. Soon after they make up. Philip receives an offer to join and later take over the clinic of Dr. Waldemar Wecker in Freiburg. Philip is reluctant to take the offer thinking Nelly would refuse to move to Freiburg. The Grieshaber farm is visited by Leonie "Leo" and her mother Helena. While Paulina and Leo become fast friends, Philip and Helena start developing feelings for each other. Helena is working for the Youth Welfare Office and is moving to Freiburg so Leo can be closer to her birth father Andreas.

Leo wishes for a dog for her birthday, and against Helena's receives the puppy Jojo. Nelly and Philip decide to move to Freiburg and Philip starts his new job. Greta who returned from her exchange year is now living in a student home in Freiburg and feels unhappy about her situation, contemplating moving back in with her father. Philip is in need of a second veterinary assistant. Greta moves to a shared apartment with other students and starts working for her father to finance the apartment. Philip and Helena become a couple, which disappoints Leo who hoped her parents would reconcile. Later on, Leo starts to accept Philip and his relationship with her mother. Leo becomes friends with Jan, a boy her mother is working with. Jan's father Martin is working as a construction worker and often leaves the town, forcing Jan to live on his on. As he is still a minor, he is put into a foster family. When Martin comes back to Freiburg and realises his son has been put into a foster family, he decides to quit his job and find something more stable in the city. Martin starts working as a cook in Ferdy's Restaurant. Leo and Jan start school and get put in the same home room. There they meet and later befriend Linus and mean girls Charlotte "Charlie" and Deborah "Debbie".

=== Season 7 ===
While on a walk, Leo and Paulina find a house in Waldau and Leo decides she wants her family to move in. When she shows the house to Philip and Helena, they both are enthusiastic and decide to move back to Waldau with Nelly and Leo. Jan is back living with his father Martin and both moved to Waldau as well to be with Martin's girlfriend Petra, a horse farmer. Jan is not happy as he is scared of horses. Also living on Petra's farm are Lucy, Petra's daughter, and Jakob with his parrot Bingo. Petra and Martin get engaged.

Greta is now dating farmer and hunter Felix, and is still working as her father's assistant. She also applied to various universities to study veterinary medicine and is waiting for answers. She is accepted at the University of Munich (LMU Munich) and moves there for her studies.

Tim is living with is grandfather Waldemar in an old circus cart in Waldau. But Waldemar is sick and is brought to the hospital. In order to help Tim, Nelly and Leo convince Helena and Philip to take Tim in as a foster child.

=== Season 8 ===
Maria and Tomasz reveal to their children, Paulina and Pawel, that they want to move back to Poland to take over the farm of Maria's parents. Pawel seems to take the news well, while Paulina is unhappy to leave the place she considers home. Lucy comes up with the idea that Paulina could move to her family's horse farm. Maria and Tomasz agree after some contemplation, leaving Paulina in Waldau while thy and Pawel return to Poland.

Leo's dog Jojo seems to bark at Nina, one of Leo's friends, a lot and it turns out that Nina has diabetes Jojo detects when Nina's glucose levels are low. After unsuccessfully trying to find a medical service dog to assist Nina, Leo lets Jojo be tested and it turns out Jojo is qualified for the task. Leo then decides to gift Jojo to Nina to help her friend. Tim's grandfather Waldemar is currently in rehab for his sickness and will soon be allowed to return home, but dies soon after from old age. Helena decides the house is too small and tries to find a location to relocate Philips clinic to. She is also thinking about taking a sabbatical. Tim overhears a conversation between Philip and Helena, where she is complaining about being overworked. He assumes he is becoming a burden to the family and runs away from home. Philip and Helena find him soon after and convince him that he is a part of the family.

Philip finds a new location for his clinic. Nelly is working as Philip's assistant ever since Greta's move. Felix's sister Anne and her daughter Toni, who has down syndrome, move in with him. At first Toni is very unhappy but soon finds friends in Jan, Lucy and Paulina. Martin loses his job after the restaurant goes bankrupt. He decides to open his own food truck. Josefine and Helena are bothered by Vinzenz's behaviour and decide that Josefine should run against him in the next mayor election. Vinzenz loses against his wife and she becomes Waldau's new mayor. Nelly falls for Joel and they start dating. Jan and his classmate Lea also start to develop feelings for each other. Farmer's son Paul develops feelings for Paulina but she is uninterested and later falls for a girl, Martha. Petra and Martin are wed by Josefine.

=== Season 9 ===
Jan is travelling to Canada, Paulina to Poland. When Philip needs the help of a specialist to treat a patient, he meets Dr. Kajo Winter. Kajo is the son of one of Philip's former professors and up until recently lived in Kenya, who is trying to find a new clinic to work at in the Black Forest region. His stories about Africa cause Helena and Tim to be very excited with the idea of moving to Kenya, Philip and Leo are less enthusiastic about the idea. But after some contemplation the family decides to take the step and move to Kenya, Philip taking over Kajo's clinic there. Kajo moves into Philip's house and takes over the clinic. After his wife's death due to sepsis he decided to move back to Germany with his sons Liam and Sam. While Sam seems happy in Waldau, Liam seems to have a hard time adjusting to his new live. A new forester named Dina Estili moves to Waldau with her daughter Ronja and their dog Pari.

Josefine struggles with her new job as mayor, after being harassed for some of her policies. The stalker later shows up on the Grieshaber farm and is discovered. Paulina is back from Poland and is happy to see Martha again. After coming out to her parents back in Poland, she decides to tell Petra and Martin as well. Martha, however, feels unsure about coming out to her mother. When she finally finds the courage to talk to her mother, she is not take seriously. When Paulina realises that Martha lied to her about her mother accepting her, she decides to break up with her and return to Poland. Martha can convince her mother that she is serious about Paulina and her mother drives her to the bus stop before Paulina can leave. Paulina and Martha make up and get back together.

Kajo and Dina develop romantic feelings, but Kajo does not feel ready to enter a new relationship so soon after his wife's death. Ronja and Liam, however, notice that their parents seem to have fallen for each other and try to get them back together. They succeed and Kajo and Dina become a couple. Sam finds a dog named Tinka whose owners do not have enough time for her anymore. After talking to the owners, they decide to gift Tinka to Sam. Ferdy experiences a burnout and asks Martin to take over his restaurant. Matin decides to give up on the food truck and take over the restaurant.

=== Season 10 ===
Vinzenz, together with Josefine's brother Valentin Randersagger, invested a substantial amount of money in a holiday home development and lost everything. Thereupon, Vinzenz decides to leave the Grieshaber farm forever. Valentin decides to move to the farm with his son Taddeo, to live with his sister. Leo is back from Kenya, visiting friends in Waldau.

== Cast ==
Actor	Character	Seasons as main character	Seasons as side character	Still active?
Enya Elstner	Greta Hansen	1-2	3-9	No
Lotte Hanné	Lilie Hansen	1-2	3-6	No
Heikko Deutschmann	Dr. Philip Hansen	1-9	--	No
Floriane Daniel	Annette Hansen	1-4	5-6	No
Fynn Henkel	Jonas Grieshaber	1-2	3-5	No
Michael Sideris	Vinzenz Grieshaber	1-6	7-9	No
Sanne Schnapp	Josefine Grieshaber	1-6, 10	7-	Yes
Jule-Marleen Schuck	Nelly Spieker	3-6	7-9	No
Tabea Hug	Paulina Kulka	3-8	9	No
Moritz Knapp	Pawel Kulka	3-6	7-8	No
Phillis Lara Lau	Leonie "Leo" Brüggemann	6-9	10	Yes
Julia Jäger	Helena Brüggemann	6-9	--	No
Paulina Schnurrer	Lucy Krämer	7-	--	Yes
Giuliano Marieni	Jan Kalkbrenner	6-8	--	No
Jana Reinermann	Petra Krämer	8-	7	Yes
Tim Kalkhof / Sebastian Achilles	Martin Kalkbrenner	8-	6-7	Yes
Anna Malner	Toni Brenner	8-	--	Yes
Jochen Schropp	Dr. Kajo Winter	9-	--	Yes
Yann Cosack	Sam Winter	9-	--	Yes
Nils Hofschneider	Liam Winter	9-	--	Yes
Maya Haddad	Dina Estili	9-	--	Yes
Kaya Völkers	Ronja Estili	9-	--	Yes
Kajetan Filip Simon	Taddeo Randersagger	10	--	Yes
Uke Bosse	Valentin Randersagger	10	--	Yes

== Filming Locations ==
The show is set in the fictional village Waldau and is filmed in Glottertal, St. Peter, St. Märgen, Sexau (Hochburg), Waldkirch (Kastelburg), Denzlingen (St. Severin), Freiburg im Breisgau, Waldau a district of Titisee-Neustadt and in Unteribental ("Biohof Jung"). As a filming location in the Glottertal the Carlsbau and surrounding area was used, which is also the setting of the ZDF-show Die Schwarzwaldklinink from the 1980s.

== See also ==
- List of German television series
