= Henry Dietz =

Henry Dietz may refer to:

- Henry A. Dietz (fl. 1960s–2020s), American professor of government and author
- Henry M. Dietz (1892–?), member of the New York State Assembly
- Harry Frederick Dietz (1890–1954), American economic entomologist
