= Diez =

Diez may refer to:

- Diez (surname)
- Diez, a sports newspaper in Bolivia
- Diez (Honduras), a newspaper in Honduras
- Diez or X, an album by Intocable
- Diez, Germany, a town in Rhineland-Palatinate
- Diez (Verbandsgemeinde), a collective municipality in Rhineland-Palatinate

== See also ==
- Dietz
