= Teets =

- Language: American English

Origin
- Language: German
- Origin: Dietz

Teets is a surname, an Americanized form of German Dietz. Notable people with the surname include:

- Harley O. Teets (1906–1957), American prison warden
- Peter B. Teets (1942-2020), American government official
