= Schwarzenburg (Breisgau) =

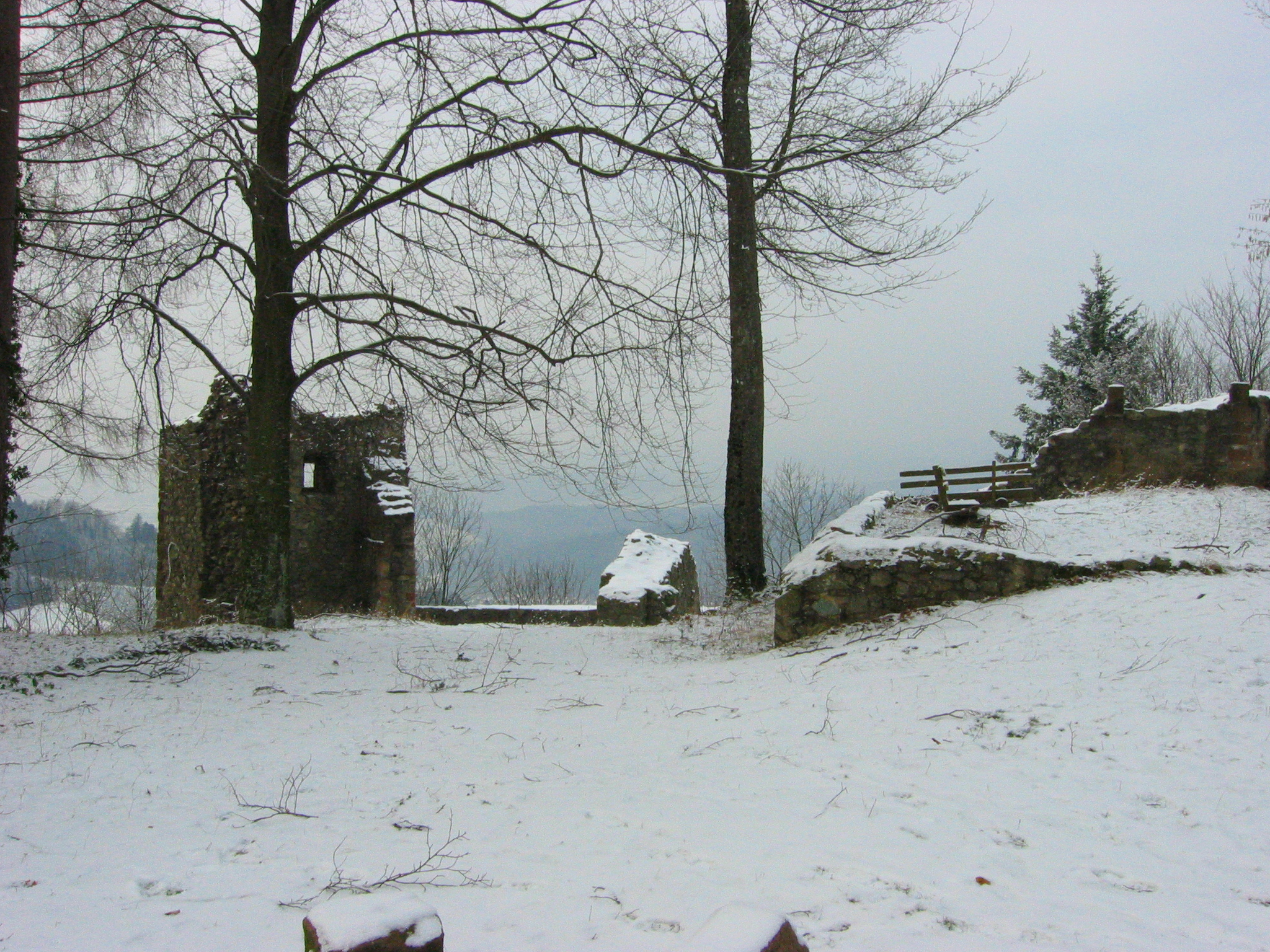
- The ruins of the Schwarzenburg looking towards Waldkirch

Highest point
- Elevation: 656.2 m (2,153 ft)
- Coordinates: 48°04′12.62″N 7°57′47.45″E

Geography
- Location within Baden-Württemberg Location within Germany
- Location: Baden-Württemberg, Germany
- Parent range: Black Forest

Ground Plan

The Schwarzenburg (Black Castle), historically called Schwarzenberg (Black Mountain), is a castle near Waldkirch in the district Emmendingen in the southwest of Baden-Württemberg in southern Germany.

== Location ==
Along with the Kastelburg, the less well known Schwarzenburg is one of two ruined castles owned by the town Waldkirch. The ruins of the former hill castle, 656.2 m (2153 ft) above sea level on the top of the Schwarzenberg ('Black Mountain'), a spur of the Kandel have decayed to such an extent that only a few wall foundation are visible.

== History ==
The castle was probably built as a refuge castle and as well as for security, possibly to protect the political power of the Schwarzenberg family. Such a castle, on a vantage point visible from far away in the Rhine Valley, was clear evidence of their status as free noblemen, subordinate in rank only to the Holy Roman Emperor.

In sharp contrast to Waldkirch and the Kastelburg, which was built later, the Schwarzburg was not a fief of Further Austria, but the allodial property of the Schwarzenbergs until they died out in the mid-15th century.

The Schwarzenburg was built around 1120 by the patrons of the monastery St. Margaret in Waldkirch under Conrad Waldkilcha, who after 1120 called himself Conrad of Suarzinberg and thus became the founder of the noble family of Schwarzenberg.

With Conrad, the male branch of the Conradines of Waldkirch died out. In 1213, their estates were transferred to Conrad's sister, Adelheid, wife of Walter I of Eschenbach-Schnabelburg. In 1270, John, a descendant of Adelheid who came with his nephew William from Switzerland, inherited the territory and called himself John I of Schwarzenberg. On 8 August 1300, John and William of Schwarzenberg granted Waldkirch town privileges. In 1315, the territory was divided: John took over the Kastelburg and William remained on the Schwarzenburg.

The Schwarzenberg family line died out in 1347 with Lord Ulrich II of Schwarzenberg. He was succeeded by John III of the Kastelberg line. This led to the reunification of the two lines.

After the death of Hans Werner of Schwarzenberg in 1459, his son-in-law Henry of Rechenberg zu Hohenrechberg inherited the estate and the office of bailiff (Amtmann). In 1503, Martin of Rechenberg succeeded his late father, Henry; he, in turn, was succeeded in 1540 by his son Hans Louis of Rechberg. After the death of Hans Louis in 1542, Sebastian of Ehingen acquired the estate. During the wedding ceremony of his daughter in 1559, he was stabbed by his son, whereupon the rule of Schwarzenberg was transferred to Hans Raphael Reischach as a fief in 1560.

In 1567, Ferdinand II, Archduke of Austria took over the debt-ridden territory. He ordered the demolition and removal of the dilapidated Schwarzenburg castle in 1578. This order was not carried out, however. An inspection in 1583, by the Further Austrian government agency of Ensisheim led to the report: Badly dilapidated. In accordance with the report of an annalist of the Margarethenstift Waldkirch of 1590, not much was left of the roof structure and the walls had collapsed. The ruin was eventually used as a quarry.

== Today ==
From 1975, the castle was successively researched and restored and, since 1980, has been accessible to the public. In 1995, the town of Waldkirch erected an information board of the history of the castle next to the ruins.
