= August Faller GmbH & Co. KG =

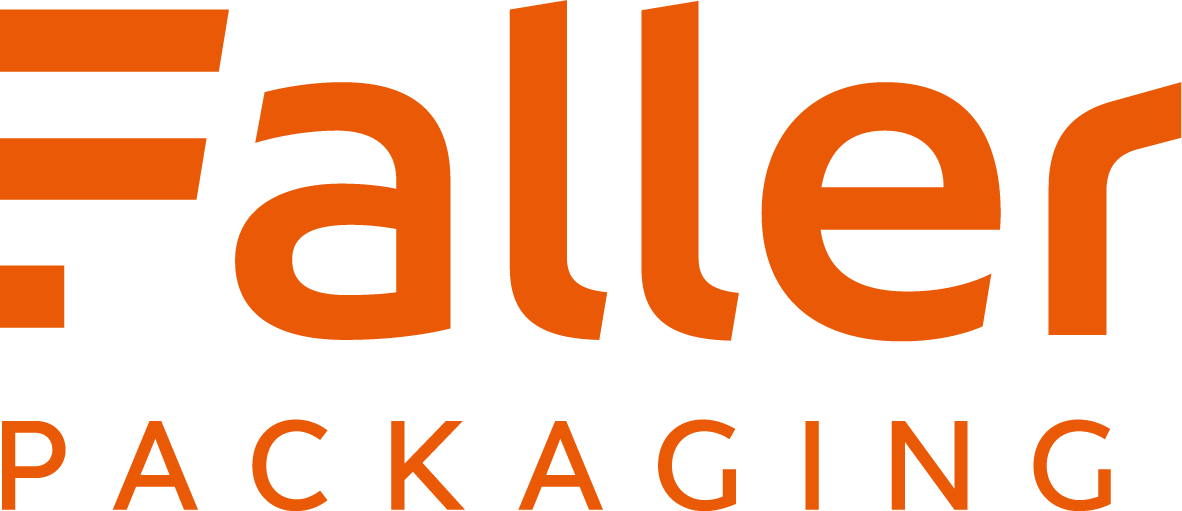
- Company type: GmbH & CO. KG
- Industry: Packaging manufacturer
- Founded: May 1, 1882; 144 years ago
- Headquarters: Waldkirch, Germany
- Key people: Dagmar Schmidt
- Revenue: EUR 185 million (2024)(2024)
- Number of employees: 1.354 (2024)
- Website: faller-packaging.com

August Faller GmbH & Co. KG is a German manufacturer and system supplier of pharmaceutical secondary packaging based in Waldkirch, in Baden-Württemberg, Germany. The company operates several locations across Europe, where it produces folding cartons, leaflets, labels and combination products, and offers services related to pharmaceutical packaging.

== History ==
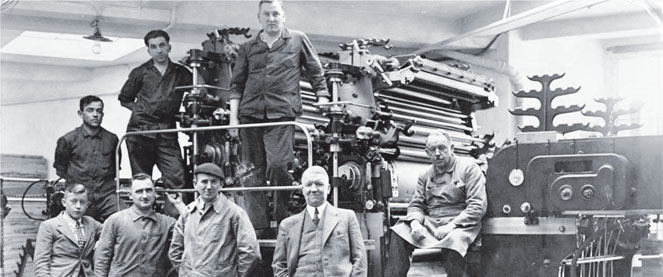
Ernst Faller & Hermann Schönle (2nd generation to go into the family business)

The history of Faller Packaging dates back to 1882. At that time, August Faller as a lithographic printing plant in Waldkirch, Germany, where he produced letterheads, postcards, and business stationery, among other things.

In 1953, August Faller began manufacturing folding cartons and labels. In 1956, the company moved from its original headquarters on Schlettstadtallee to a new building at 25 Freiburger Straße. Three years later, a major fire destroyed the paper warehouse and significant parts of the production facility. Only with the generous support of friendly printing companies in the region was the family-owned business able to weather the crisis. The first expansion projects followed in 1960, and a new production hall was built in 1970.

At a strategy meeting in 1993, management decided to place greater focus on the development and production of secondary packaging materials for the pharmaceutical industry. This business segment now accounts for approximately 95 percent of revenue. Between 1999 and 2002, the August Faller Group was formed, comprising Faller, St. Göppert GmbH & Co. KG in Waldkirch, Meyerhofer, Fries & Cie. GmbH in Lörrach, Germany, and Trefzer Druck GmbH in Schopfheim, Germany. During this period, the company expanded its portfolio to include the production of labels and leaflets.

In autumn 2003, the companies were merged into a single entity, August Faller GmbH & Co. KG. That same year, the packaging specialist moved into a new production and logistics facility with an administrative wing in Binzen, Germany, and closed its previous location in Lörrach. In 2019, August Faller was rebranded as Faller Packaging.

On May 1, 2022, Faller Packaging celebrated its 140th anniversary.

Since July 1, 2024, Dagmar Schmidt has been leading the group of companies as the successor to Daniel Keesman and Michael Faller. This marks the first time in the company’s history that no member of the founding family is directly involved in management.

== Awards ==
=== Product awards ===
- 2014: German Packaging Award 2014 for the Hanger Info Label – Category: Labels, Closures, and Other Packaging Accessories
- 2016: German Packaging Award for the Faller Pharma Compliance Pack and World Star Award for the Hanger Info Label
- 2018: German Design Award, awarded by the German Design Council, for the Faller Pharma Compliance Pack
- 2020: German Packaging Award for PackEx
