= Waldkirch =

- Town
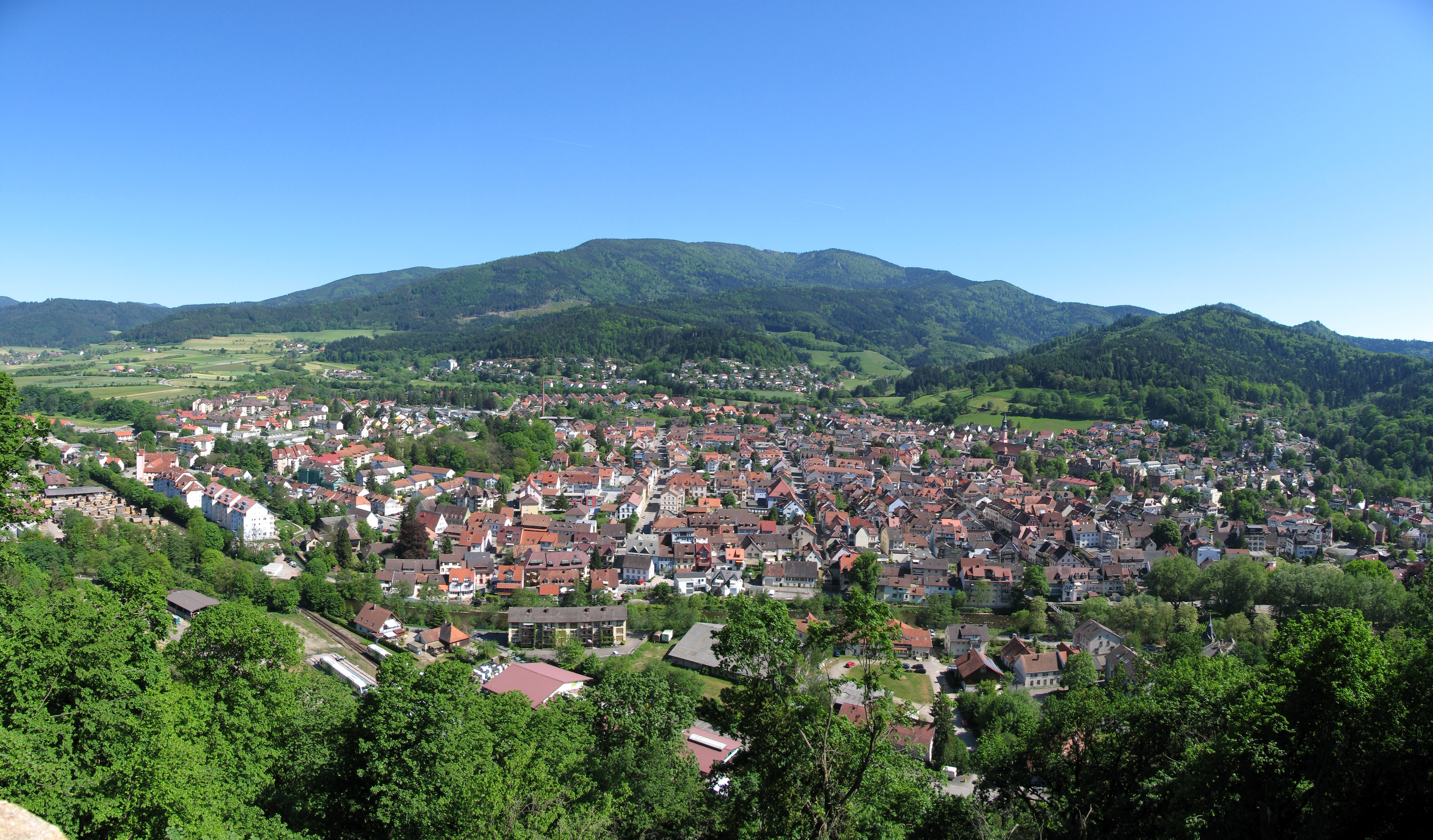

- Coat of arms

- Location of Waldkirch within Emmendingen district
- Interactive map of Waldkirch
- Location within Germany Location within Baden-Württemberg
- Coordinates: 48°6′N 7°58′E
- Country: Germany
- State: Baden-Württemberg
- Admin. region: Freiburg
- District: Emmendingen
- Subdivisions: 5

Government
  - Mayor (2023–31): Michael Schmieder

Area
  - Total: 48.47 km^{2} (18.71 sq mi)
- Elevation: 274 m (899 ft)

Population (2025-12-31)
  - Total: 21,725
  - Density: 448.2/km^{2} (1,161/sq mi)
- Time zone: UTC+01:00 (CET)
  - Summer (DST): UTC+02:00 (CEST)
- Postal codes: 79183
- Dialling codes: 07681
- Vehicle registration: EM
- Website: www.stadt-waldkirch.de

Waldkirch (German pronunciation: [ˈvaltˌkɪʁç]) is a town in Baden-Württemberg, Germany, located 15 kilometers northeast of Freiburg im Breisgau. While the English translation of its name is Forest Church, it is known as the "town of mechanical organs", where fairground organs played on the streets were long manufactured by such well-known firms as Carl Frei (later of Breda, Netherlands), Andreas Ruth and Son, and Wilhelm Bruder and Sons. The largest employers today are SICK AG, which manufactures optical sensors, Faller AG, which prints pharmaceutical packages and inserts, and Mack Rides, which exports amusement park and water park rides worldwide. Cultural events include the Klappe 11 Cinema festival, the Organ Festival and the Peter Feuchtwanger Piano Masterclass.

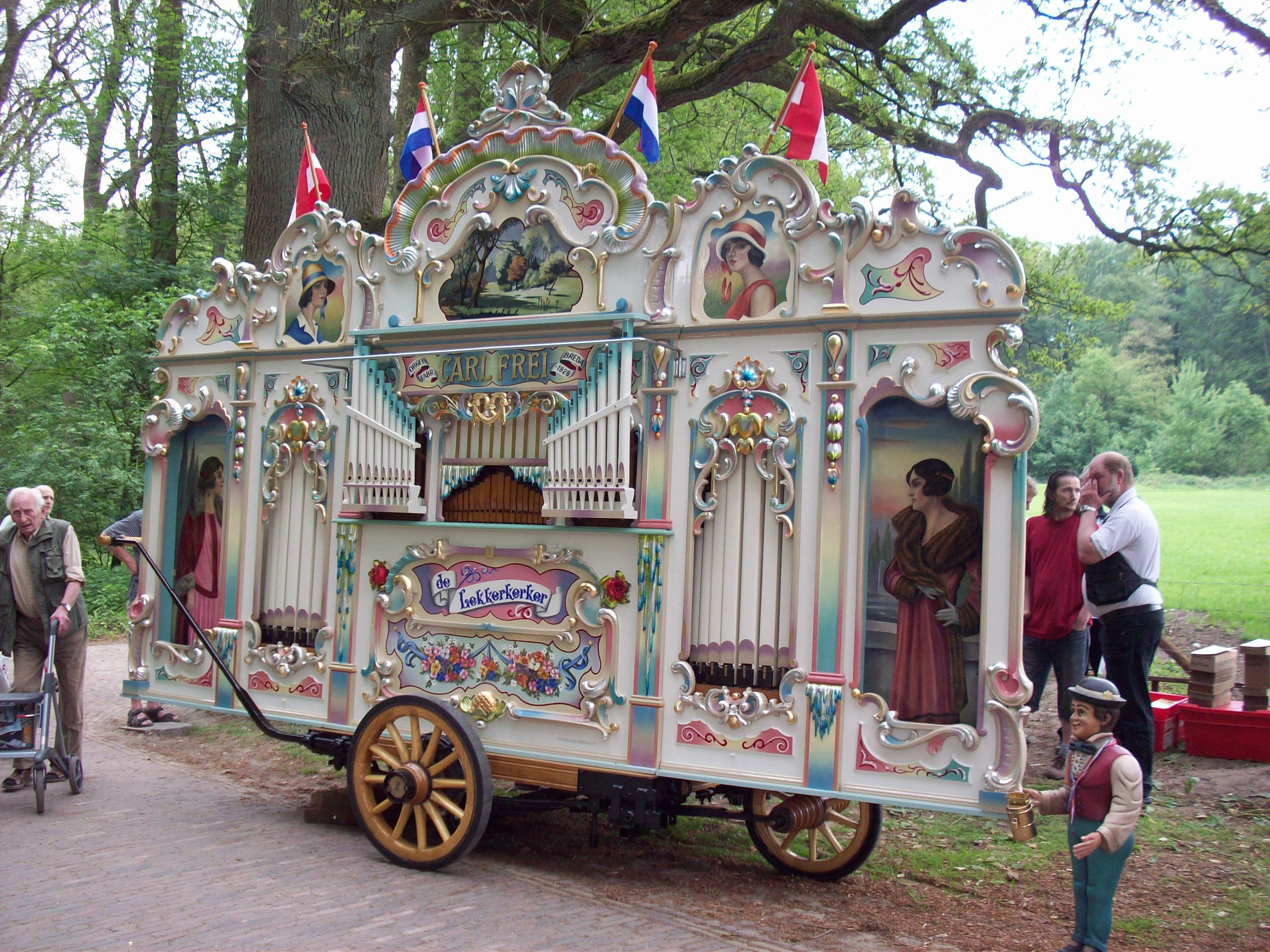
Carl Frei

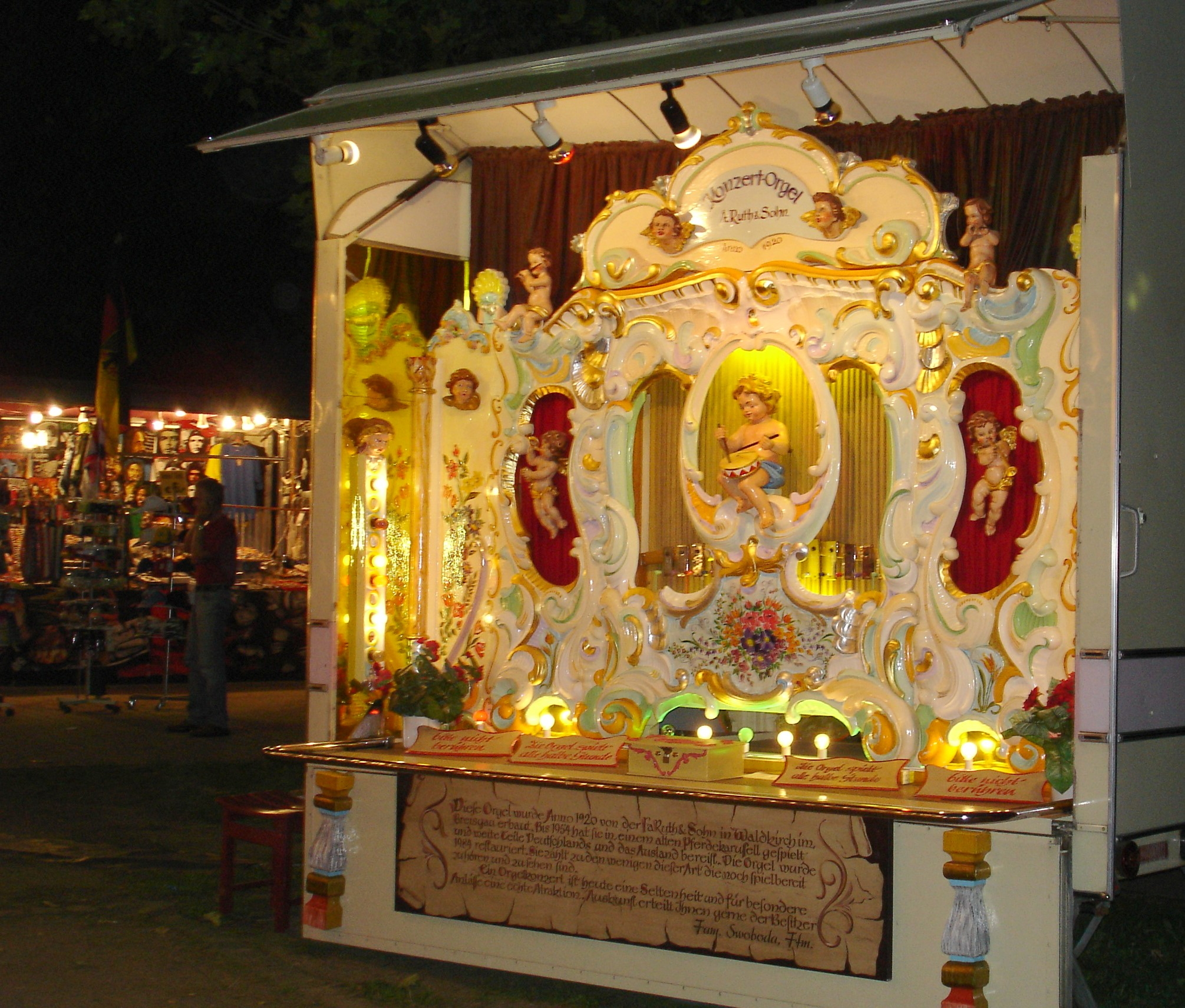
A. Ruth & Sohn

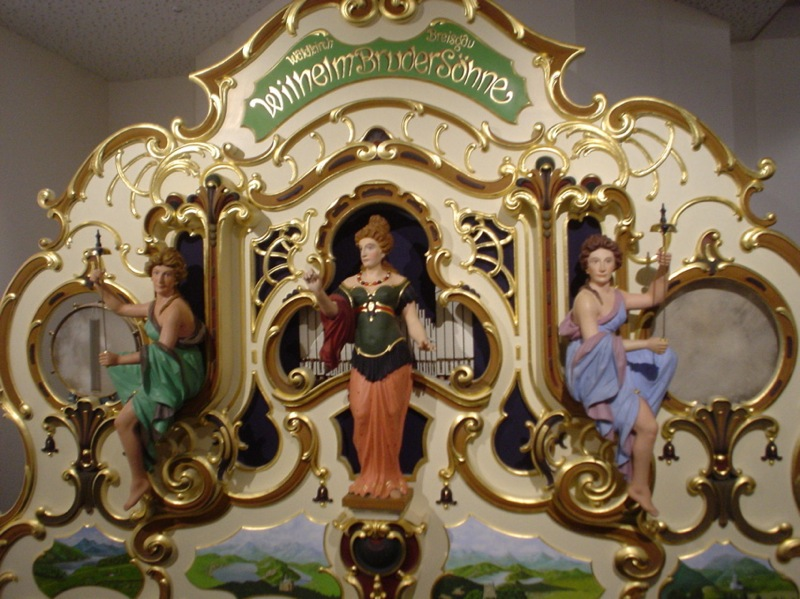
Wilhelm Bruder Söhne

== Geography ==
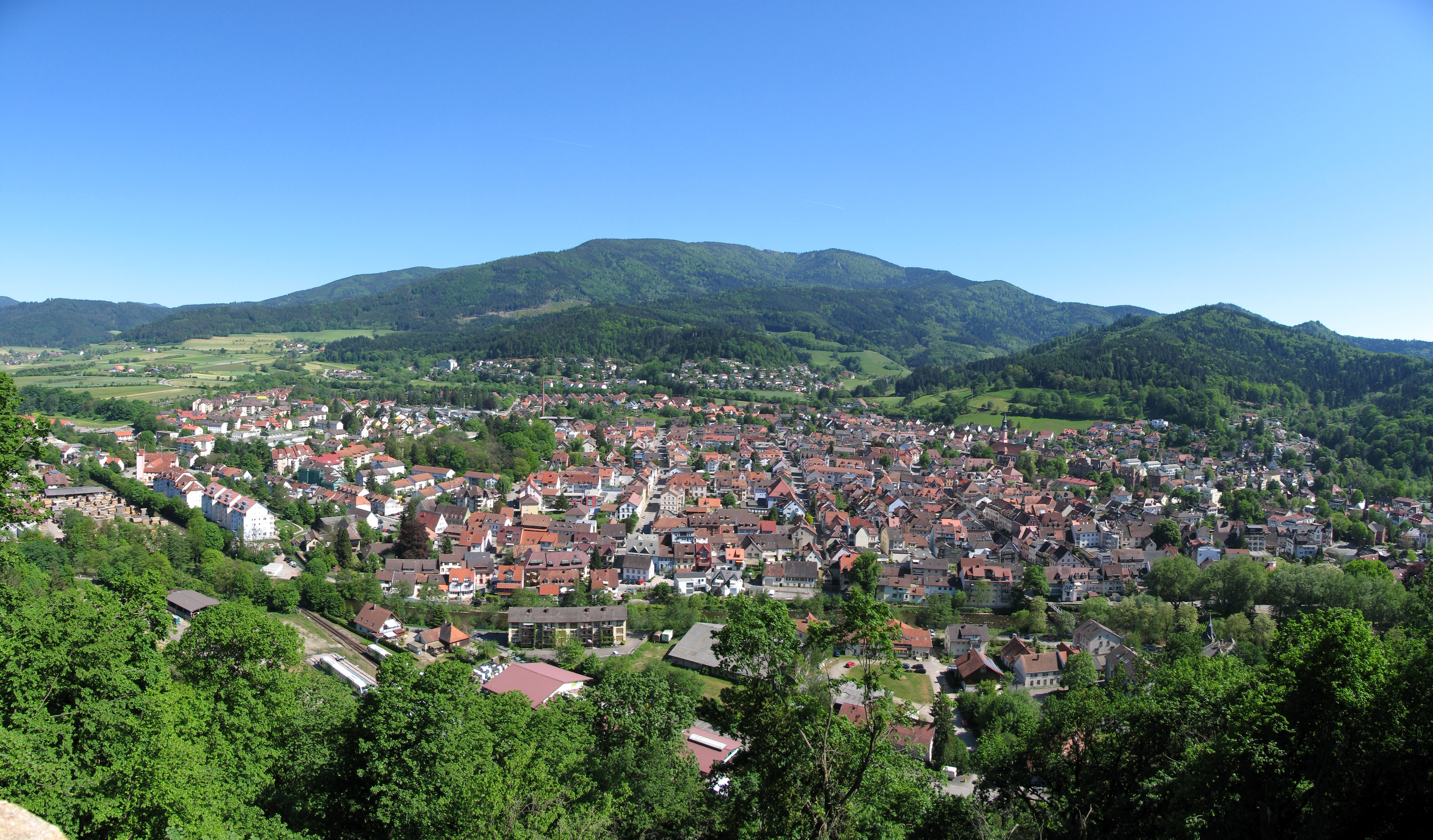
Waldkirch from Kastelburg in spring...

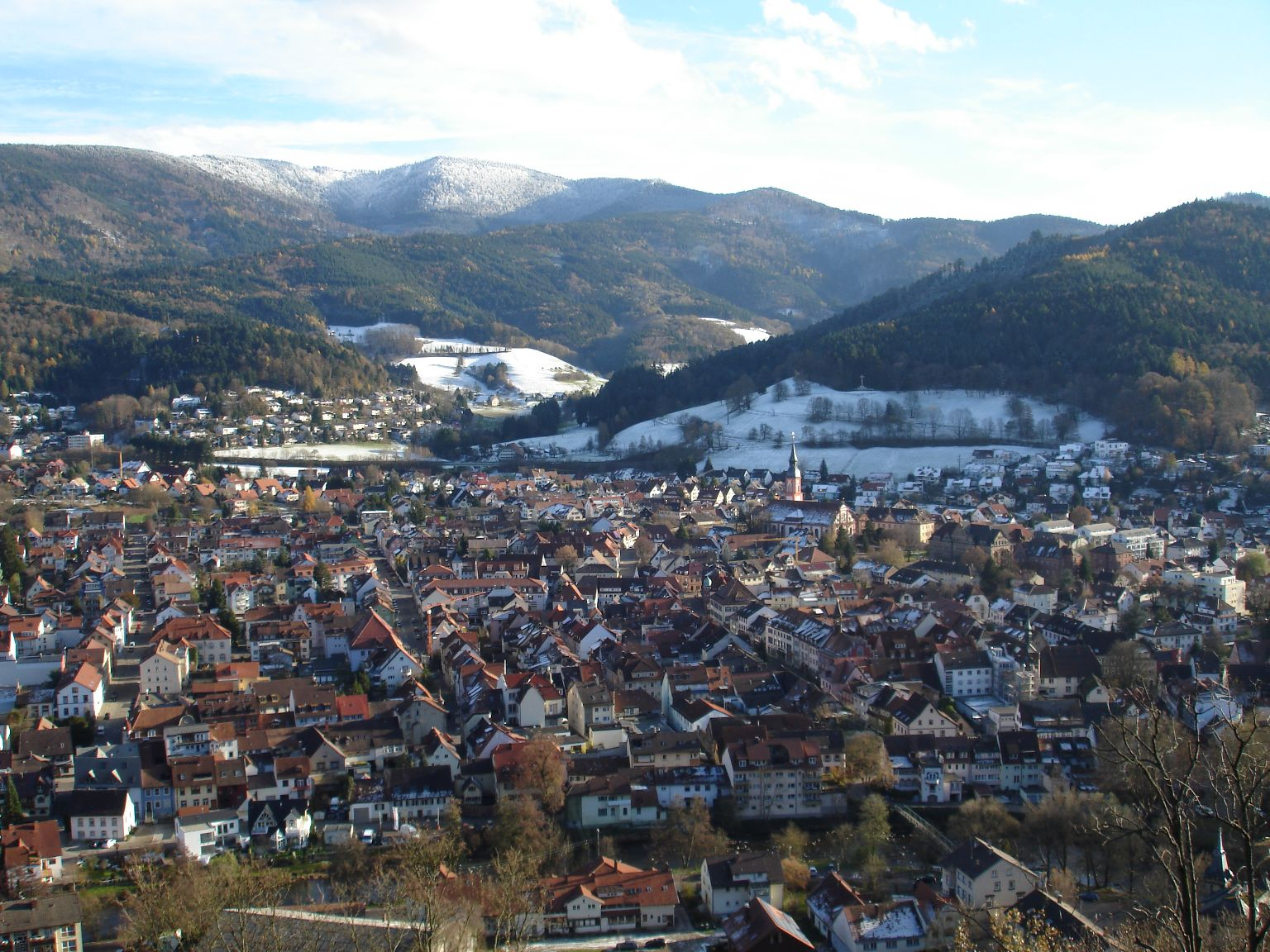
...and in winter, with the Kandel mountain in the background

=== Geographic location ===
Waldkirch is located directly at the foot of the Kandel mountain, which is 1241 meters high. The lowest point of Waldkirch is 243 meters above sea level, so the difference in altitude in the district is 998 meters. The town lies alongside the Elz River in the south-western part of the Black Forest. The neighbouring municipalities in the Elz valley are Freiamt, Gutach im Breisgau and Simonswald, in the south-eastern branch of the Simonswälder valley. The district is bordered by Sankt Peter, Glottertal, Denzlingen and Sexau.

Due to its location in the Upper Rhine Plain Waldkirch experiences small earthquakes occasionally. The last major earthquake with a magnitude of 5.4 on the Richter scale occurred on December 5, 2004, with the epicenter below the Kandel massif.

=== Subdivisions of the town ===
The districts Buchholz, Kollnau, Siensbach including the road towards it ("Siensbacher Weg"), Suggental and Waldkirch belong to the town of Waldkirch. The boundaries of the districts are the same as those of the former independent municipalities. With the exception of the Waldkirch district, the official name of the districts is given by prefixing the name of the city and connecting it to the name of the respective district by a hyphen. The districts Buchholz, Kollnau, Siensbach as well as Suggental are localities ("Ortschaften") according to the Baden-Württemberg municipal regulations. The local councillor ("Ortschaftsrat") and the local head of town ("Ortsvorsteher") are directly elected by the eligible voters in local elections. In the villages there are administrative offices called "Stadt Waldkirch - Ortsverwaltung". The Buchholz district includes the village of Buchholz and the hamlet of Batzenhäusle. The Kollnau district includes the village of the same name and the farms Harnischwald, Kohlenbach and Übental. The Siensbach district, including the Siensbacher Weg, includes the hamlets of Obertal (Dobel), Untertal and Zinken, the Biehl and Mühletal farms as well as the residential areas Beim Rechen and Eichbühl. The Waldkirch district includes the town of the same name, the hamlet of Heimeck, the farms of Dettenbach, Eschbach, Petershöfe and Wegelbach as well as the residential areas of Altersbach, Forstsiedlung and Kandelrasthaus. The Waldkirch district also includes the hamlet of Stahlhof, which until 1936 was an independent district together with the districts of Dettenbach, Heimeck, Petershöfe and Wegelbach, the castles of Kastelburg and Schwarzenburg as well as the abandoned ruins of the castles of Küchlinsburg (of the Küchlin family) and Kyffelburg and the abandoned town of Weiler.

== History ==
The earliest known mention of Waldkirch is the foundation of the Saint Margaret convent, by the Swabian duke Buchard II around the year 918. The settlement was later under the rule of the Schwarzenbergs, who in the 13th century built the Kastelburg and the Schwarzenburg castles alongside the settlement, also adding a city wall. Schwarzenberg governors gave town privileges to Waldkirch on the 8th of August 1300. The von Rechbergs inherited the territory in 1457, followed by Sebastian von Ehingen in 1546 and Hans Raphael of Reischach in 1560. In 1567 Archduke Ferdinand of Austria gained rule over Schwarzenberg with the town of Waldkirch and from 1805 onwards, Waldkirch was an administrative seat of Outer Austria. The city then fell to the Grand Duchy of Baden and was an administrative seat of the district of Baden until 1936. Since then it has belonged to the district of Emmendingen. After World War II, which the town survived largely undamaged, Waldkirch belonged to the federal state of (South) Baden and thus lay within the federal state Baden-Württemberg newly constituted in 1952. The present day town was enlarged as part of the municipal reform on 1 January 1975. The reform unified the town Waldkirch with the towns Buchholz and Kollnau. The city was renamed Waldkirch–Kollnau on the day of reform. On 1 July 1971 and 1 January 1973, respectively, Suggental and Siensbach were also incorporated into Waldkirch. On 1 January 2009 Waldkirch was raised the rank of a major district seat.

=== Coat of arms ===
==== Description ====
The arms of Waldkirch is in the canting arms style. The field of light blue has centered between supporters of lime (left) and oak (right) branches a silver church with a red roof and golden cross topping six hills in dark blue. The church refers to the name of the city. The six hills are based on the coat of arms of the Barrens of Swarzenberg. The arms is based on the oldest known seal from the 13th Century and was given to the city on 5 May 1976.

==== Old coat of arms ====
Between 1634 and 1976 the city used a coat of arms without the six hills. This arms had a blue and green background above and below the depicted double towered church, the right and left lined with two silver trees. Shown at the bottom of the coat of arms were three more silver trees.

== Sights ==
- The Catholic Church St. Magarethen
- The ruin of the Kastelburg
- The market place with the town hall
- Elztalmuseum, many examples of the mechanical organs built in the town

== Twin towns – sister cities ==
Waldkirch is twinned with:

- Charleroi, Belgium
- Chavanay, France
- Liestal, Switzerland
- Sélestat, France
- Worthing, England, United Kingdom

== Economy and Infrastructure ==
Waldkirch has a long history of industry and craftsmanship. The tradition of gemstone cutting, which reaches back to the Middle Ages, is still upheld today by the Wintermantel company. Organ building in Waldkirch, first established by Matthias Martin in 1799, grew to include barrel organs and orchestrions in the 19th century, gaining worldwide renown well into the 1920s. The organ builders Jäger and Brommer, Paul Fleck Söhne, Achim Schneider and Wolfram Stützle continue the tradition to this day. During the industrial revolution, Waldkirch - along with the entire Valley of the Elz - was an important location of the textile industry. Of this tradition, all that remains today is the Gütermann company in the neighboring community of Gutach. In contrast, optical and electrical manufacturing, represented in Waldkirch by the company SICK AG, has been enjoying steady growth since World War II, as has paper manufacturing represented by the company August Faller GmbH. Since 1877, a successful viticulture has been established in the district of Buchholz, which is also known trans-regionally for its cultivation of fruit and berries. In the district of Suggental, several silver mines were in use during the Middle Ages. Some parts of the mines are being uncovered and made accessible again by the mining research team Suggental, and tourist visits can be arranged ("Silberbergwerk Suggental"). Tourism is another important economic sector for Waldkirch, which is located alongside the German Clock Road ("Deutsche Uhrenstraße"), and is also a part of the Network of German Organ Road ("Kulturnetzwerk Deutsche Orgelstraße"). Friends of winter sports will enjoy the ski lifts on the local mountain, the Kandel. The most challenging slope is the partial valley run "Nordhang" (northern slope). Since April 30, 2016, Waldkirch has a new public open-air swimming pool in the district of Kollnau.

=== Transportation ===
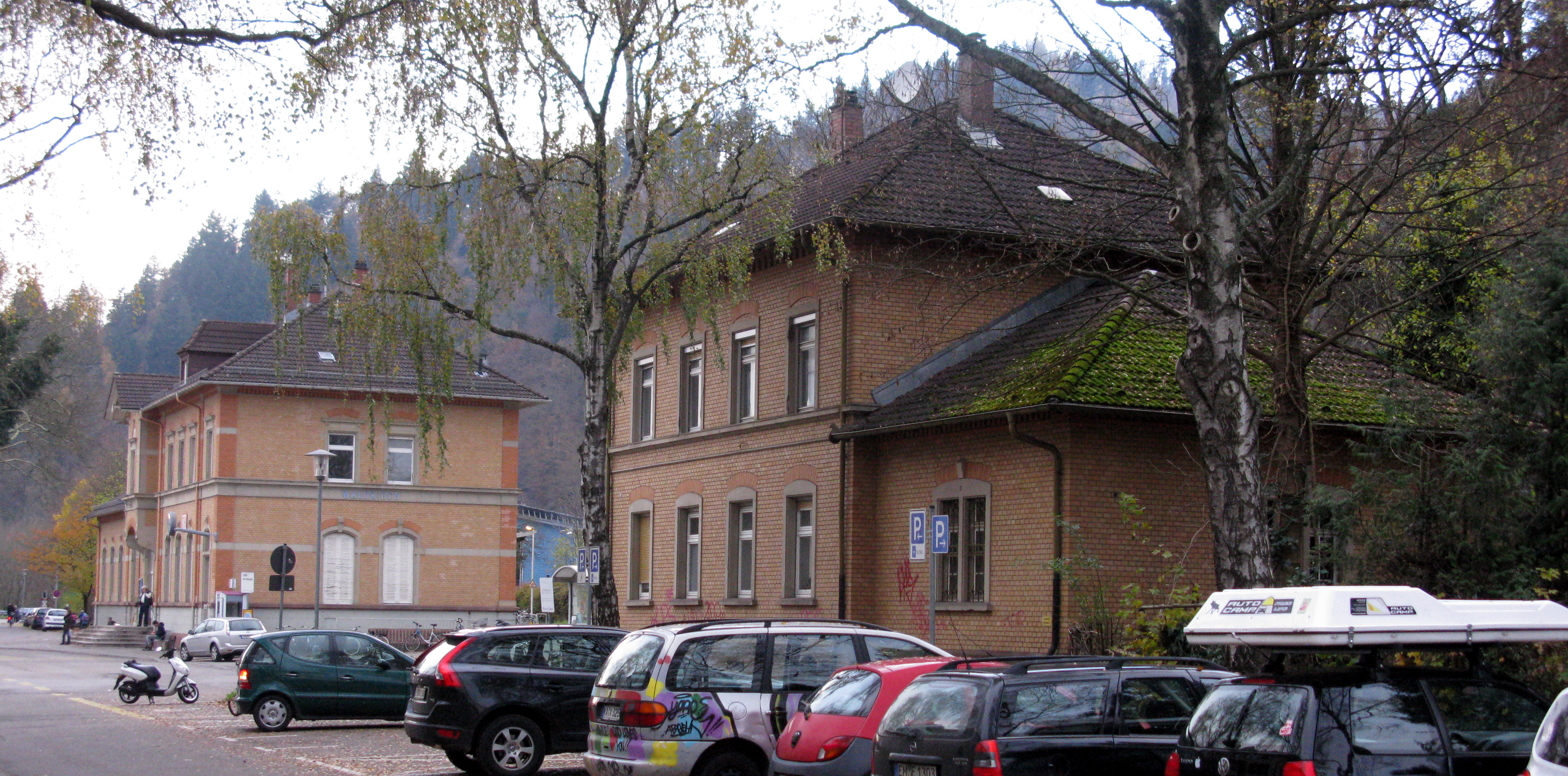
Bahnhof Waldkirch

Waldkirch is located along the Federal Highway ("Bundesstraße") 294 between Bretten and Freiburg im Breisgau. The road circumvents the town through the Hugenwaldtunnel to the south. The Kandel road ("Kandelstraße"), which starts at the northeastern edge of town, has connected Waldkirch to the Kandel since its construction in the 1930s, and was extended in the 1950s to the village of St. Peter. Waldkirch train station can be reached by the Elz Valley Railway ("Elztalbahn"), which is serviced by the regional railway operator "Breisgau S-Bahn" and runs half-hourly between Freiburg im Breisgau and Elzach. In addition, Waldkirch is serviced by two regional bus lines. The nearest railway station with access to long-distance trains is "Freiburg Hauptbahnhof" (Freiburg main station). Waldkirch is part of the regional public transportation authority "Regio-Verkehrsverbund Freiburg". The nearest international Airports are the EuroAirport Basel/Mulhouse/Freiburg, Zurich, Frankfurt, Stuttgart, the Airport Karlsruhe/Baden-Baden and Strasbourg.

=== Local Businesses ===
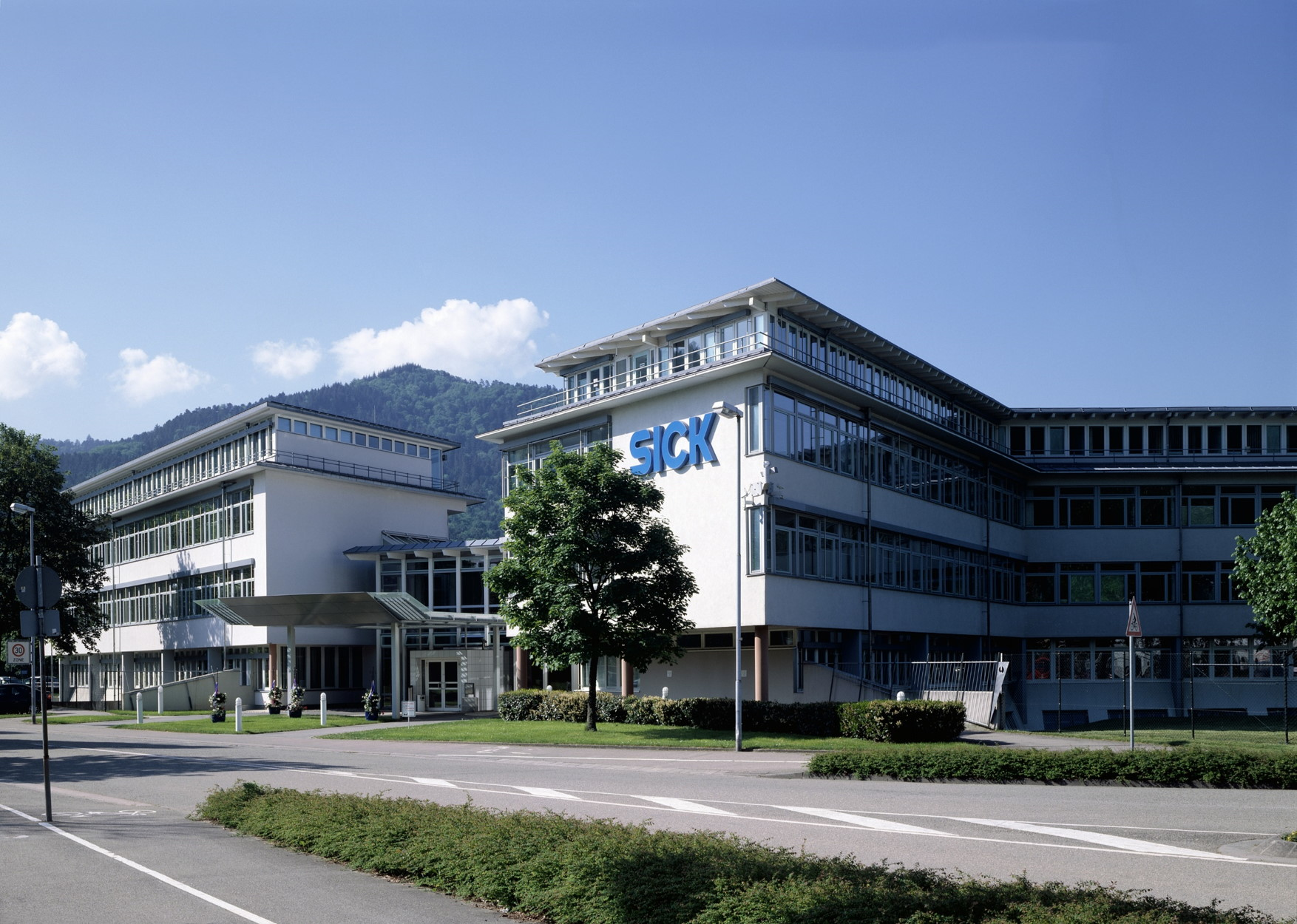
Hauptsitz der Sick AG

Some of Waldkirch's businesses are well-known beyond the immediate area, and a few operate worldwide - even as global market leaders in their field. Organ building is still an active trade, conducted by Jäger and Brommer, Paul Fleck Söhne, Achim Schneider and Wolfram Stützle. Mack Rides, a family business founded in Waldkirch in 1780, is one of the leading suppliers of amusement rides. Its former exhibition area in Rust is now home to the Europa Park, Germany's largest theme park. Another company located in Waldkirch is SICK AG, a manufacturer of industrial sensors and optical technology, with more than 8000 employees worldwide. The local company Ganter Interior is an owner-operated family business with a global market presence in interior construction and shop fitting. August Faller GmbH is another family business with its headquarters in Waldkirch, which was founded in 1882. It is one of the market leaders in pharmaceutical secondary packaging in German-speaking countries.

=== Courts and Administration ===
Waldkirch is the seat of the Waldkirch district court ("Amtsgericht Waldkirch"), which is part of the state court district of Freiburg im Breisgau, and the higher state court ("Oberlandesgericht, OLG") district of Karlsruhe, as well as the Notary's office for the municipalities of the Elztal. The former court prison next to the district court building was used as a branch of the Freiburg Prison ("JVA Freiburg"), housing day release prisoners. Since the closure of the prison branch, the building has been used as an office complex. Up until 2007, the city also housed the seat of a deanery for the Roman Catholic Archdiocese of Freiburg

=== Education ===
Schools located in Waldkirch include the Geschwister-Scholl-Gymnasium, the Realschule Kollnau, the primary school Schwarzenbergschule, the primary school and Hauptschule Kastelbergschule, the primary school and Hauptschule Buchholz, and the primary school and Hauptschule Kollnau. It also houses a centre for special education for students with learning difficulties, as well as a special needs school for students with visual impairments, the "Staatliche Schule für Sehbehinderte St. Michael", and finally, the vocational school center "Berufliches Schulzentrum Waldkirch". Another important educational facility is the municipal music school ("Städtische Musikschule"). There is also a private school, the "Freie Schule Elztal". Additionally, the city runs a full-day program at the primary school and Hauptschule Kastelbergschule, as well as a child day-care center. So childcare for all ages between 0–16 years is being provided all under one roof.

== Culture and sights ==
Waldkirch is situated on the German Clock Road, which passes many exhibition venues of ancient clocks and watch factories. The town is member of Cittàslow, a Slow movement started in Italy in 1999 to increase the quality of urban life.

=== Monuments ===
- The town chapel of Our Lady is the oldest preserved building in town. The building dates back to 1336 and was established by the townspeople, so that they would not have to go to the St. Walburga Parish Church at that time outside the town walls, which was difficult in winter and dangerous in times of war.

The chapel was rebuilt in 1931 and extended by the choir, in which the baroque high altar is placed. The side figures of this altar are attributed to Christian Wentzinger. In the church are images showing Stations of the Cross, which were created by Georg Scholz in the year 1938. He also briefly served as Mayor of the city after the end of the Second World War, before he died. The organ was built in 1894 by the organ builder Anton Kiene from Waldkirch and replaced an instrument from 1844.

- The Catholic town church of St. Margarethen (former collegiate church of the Collegiate Abbey of the same name), built in 1732-1734 by the Vorarlberg Baroque architect Peter Thumb.
- Church square with a completely preserved ensemble of baroque former canonist houses of the Collegiate St. Margarethen
- Market square with historical buildings, including Waldkirch's town hall
- Ruin of Kastelburg
- Ruin of Schwarzenburg
- Buchholz Castle

=== Museums ===
The Elztalmuseum, Kirchplatz 14, housed in the baroque former provost building, displays not only regional folk art and historical documents, but also important examples of Waldkirch barrel organ and musical instrument making. The latter is also shown at the Organ Builder's Hall, Am Gewerbekanal 1, which is run by the Waldkirch Orgelstiftung.

=== Other sights ===
- The gemstone cutting company Wintermantel, which is protected by the cultural heritage management, is one of the largest and oldest craft gemstone cutting shop preserved in the original and still in operation. It is the last remaining representative of a significant craft tradition in Breisgau.
- The Black Forest Zoo in the immediate vicinity of the recreational facilities of the city lake is an attraction for children and families.
- The medieval silver mine Suggental offers tours by appointment.
- The treetop path.

=== Regular events ===
Every three years, the Waldkirch Organ Festival takes place. In the same interval, the historic marketplace festival takes place in Waldkirch in July.

In addition, the tradition of the Swabian-Alemannic carnival is maintained in Waldkirch. It takes place in the week leading up to Lent. The Narrenzunft "Krakeelia" Waldkirch, a carnival guild, is one of the oldest in the region. At the "Schmutziger Dunschdig" (Dirty Thursday) traditionally the opening of the carnival takes place with a subsequent traditional procession. Two days later, Saturday, the Witches Sabbath of Kandelhexen takes place. Furthermore, the carnival parade through the city takes place on Sunday. On Rose Monday there is the traditional Elfimess (carnival speeches and drinks) for men. Among the customs of the Fasnet in Waldkirch is also the "Kläppere" (a type of wooden musical instrument), in which two "Kläpperli" are used to make music by rhythmical flapping.

There are regular cultural events in the AJZ Waldkirch e. V. as well as the municipal cinema of "Flap 11".

=== Sports ===
The SV Waldkirch is the largest sports club in the town. The first men's football team was Southern Baden Champion in 1969 and 1970 and Southern Baden Cup winner in 1972 and 2014 . The football department has been independent since 2016 as FC Waldkirch.

== People ==
=== Honorary Citizens ===
- Maria Luise Frick (1926–2018) was made an honorary citizen in 1992

=== Notable residents ===
- Mathias Martin (1765–1825), founder of barrel organ building in Waldkirch
- Ignaz Blasius Bruder (1780–1845), barrel organ builder
- Karl Jäger (1888–1959), SS-Standartenführer (a mid-ranking official of the SS in Nazi-Germany) and organiser of the Holocausts in Lithuania
- Georg Scholz (1890–1945), German realist painter, part of the New Objectivity art movement
- Wolfram Wette (born 1940), historian
- Richard Leibinger (born 1949), politician (SPD), mayor of Waldkirch from 1983 to 2009, Lord Mayor from 2009 to 2015.
- Roland Mack (born 1949), entrepreneur and founder of the Europa-Park
- Alexander Schoch (born 1954), politician (Bündnis 90/Die Grünen), member of the Landtag of Baden-Württemberg (State Parliament) since 2011
- Peter Weiß (born 1956), politician (CDU), member of the Bundestag (the German federal parliament) since 1998, chair of the working group Labor and Social Affairs of the CDU/CSU-Bundestagsfraktion since 2018.
- Jürgen Mack (born 1958), entrepreneur
- Heiko Herrlich (born 1971), former soccer player, now active as a coach and sports manager
- Roman Götzmann (born 1982), politician (SPD), Lord Mayor of Waldkirch since 2015

=== Notable people born in Waldkirch ===
- Balthasar Merklin (1479 in Waldkirch - 28 May 1531 in Trier) was administrator of the former Benedictine monastery St. Margarethen in Waldkirch, kaiserlicher Rat (advisor of the Holy Roman Emperor), Vizekanzler (vice-chancellor) of the Holy Roman Empire, and Bishop of Hildesheim and Konstanz.
- Ursula Gatter (died August 1603), washerwoman und mother of Agatha Gatter (born 1589), victim of the witch-hunt in Freiburg
- Franz von Zwerger (1792–1856), jurist, entrepreneur, politician (Centre Party), Town Schultheiß of Ravensburg from 1821 to 1856, and member of the Württembergischen LandtagLandtag of Württemberg from 1831 to 1844
- Ernst Friedrich Diez (1805–1892), actor and opera singer
- Xaver Weiss (1811–1898), Oberamtman (administratorial post similar to a Vogt) of the Oberamt Baden
- Franz Ludwig Meyr (1826–1907), member of the Reichstag and the Landtag (State Parliament)
- Albert Koebele (1853–1924), Entomologist and pioneer on the area of biological pest control
- Hermann Koelblin (1873–1943), publisher and member of the Landtag (State Parliament) of Baden from 1919 to 1921
- Heinrich Baumer (1891–1962), local politician (Centre Party, later CDU), part of the German resistance to Nazism, member of the Kreistag (local parliament) and the Landtag (State Parliament of Baden) from 1947 to 1952
- Rudolf Amendt (1895–1987), actor
- Max Barth (1896–1970), pedagogue, political journalist, poet
- Hans Reiner (1896–1991), philosopher
- Paul Mauk (1900–1915), soldier 113 of the 5th regiment of the infantry of Baden, who was killed in the Second Battle of Artois in France. He was the youngest German soldier to die in World War I.[11]
- Hermann Rambach (1908–1992), Heimatforscher
- Arthur Fauser (1911–1990), artist
- Franz Mack (1921–2010), entrepreneur
- Albert Burger (1925–1981), Civil Servant in administration and politician CDU, member of the Landtag of Baden-Württemberg (State Parliament) (1964–1965), member of the Bundestag (the German federal parliament) (1965–1981)
- Rudi Maier (1945–2017), Fencer
- Axel Nitz (born 1957), composer and film director
- Jo Hiller (born 1974), television reporter and journalist
- Sven Tritschler (born 1981), politician AfD, since 2017 member of the Landtag of North Rhine-Westphalia (State Parliament)
- Philip Rießle (born 1988), ice hockey player
- Daniel Schwaab (born 1988), soccer player
