= Sophie Diez =

German opera singer (1820–1887)

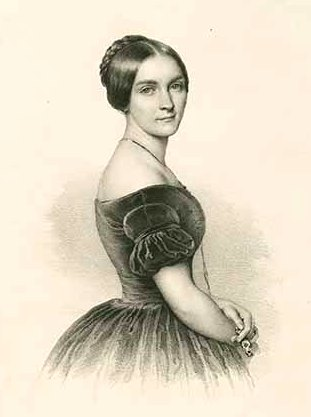
Sophie Diez

Sophie Diez or Dietz (née Hartmann) (1 September 1820 – 3 May 1887) was a German soprano who sang leading roles with the Munich Hofoper (now known as the Bavarian State Opera) in a career spanning 40 years. She is most remembered today for having created the role of Magdalena in Wagner's Die Meistersinger von Nürnberg, but she also sang in the world premieres of several other operas by lesser-known German composers.

== Life and career ==
Diez was born in Munich and received her early training from her father who was a musician in the city. In 1836 she joined the chorus of the Munich Hofoper where the conductor Franz Lachner noticed the beauty of her voice and gave her further training. She made her debut as a soloist on 1 December 1836 as Angelina in Cherubini's The Water Carrier and in February of the following year appeared as Benjamin in Étienne Méhul's Joseph. Shortly thereafter she was engaged as permanent member of the company. She went on to sing many leading roles with the Hofoper and appeared in several world premieres. By 1867, she had sung 122 roles in 94 operas, including all the female roles (apart from Marcellina) in The Marriage of Figaro and all six female roles in The Magic Flute.

In addition to her performances in Munich, Diez also appeared as a guest singer in several other German cites, including Stuttgart, Cologne, Dresden, and Hamburg. In 1866, she was given the title Kammersängerin by Prince Luitpold and a jubilee celebration was staged by the Hofoper to mark the 30th anniversary of her debut. Diez officially retired from the company in December 1877, although she made one more appearance the following April as Nandl in one of Ignaz Lachner's Alpine Scenes, Das Versprechen hinter'm Herd.

In 1841, she had married Ernst Friedrich Diez, who was 15 years her senior and sang as a tenor with the Munich Hofoper from 1837 to 1849. They appeared in several productions together, including the Munich premiere of Lortzing's Zar und Zimmermann in July 1841—she as Marie and he as the Marquis de Chateauneuf. Sophie Diez died in Munich in 1887 at the age of 66 and was buried in the Alter Südfriedhof cemetery. Her husband died five years later. Richard Strauss dedicated several of his early songs to her, including his 1879 Für Musik, a setting of Emanuel Geibel's poem "Nun die Schatten dunkeln" ("Now the Shadows Darken").

== Roles created ==
Sophie Diez sang in the following world premieres:

- Lauretta in Franz Xaver Pentenrieder's Die Nacht zu Paluzzi, Königliches Hof- und National-Theater, Munich, 2 October 1840
- Käthchen in Heinrich Esser's Die zwei Prinzen, Königliches Hof- und National-Theater, Munich, 10 April 1845
- Ascanio in Franz Lachner's Benvenuto Cellini, Königliches Hof- und National-Theater, Munich, 7 October 1849
- Magdalena in Richard Wagner's Die Meistersinger von Nürnberg, Königliches Hof- und National-Theater, Munich, 21 June 1868
- Mathilde in Josef Rheinberger's Die sieben Raben, Königliches Hof- und National-Theater, Munich, 23 May 1869
