= Feodor Dietz =

German painter

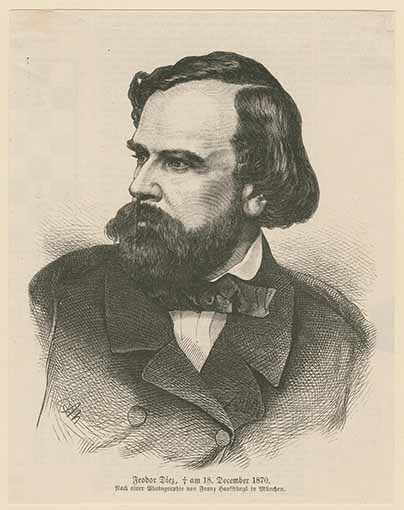
- Born: 29 May 1813; Neunstetten, Baden
- Died: 18 November 1870 (aged 57); Gray, France

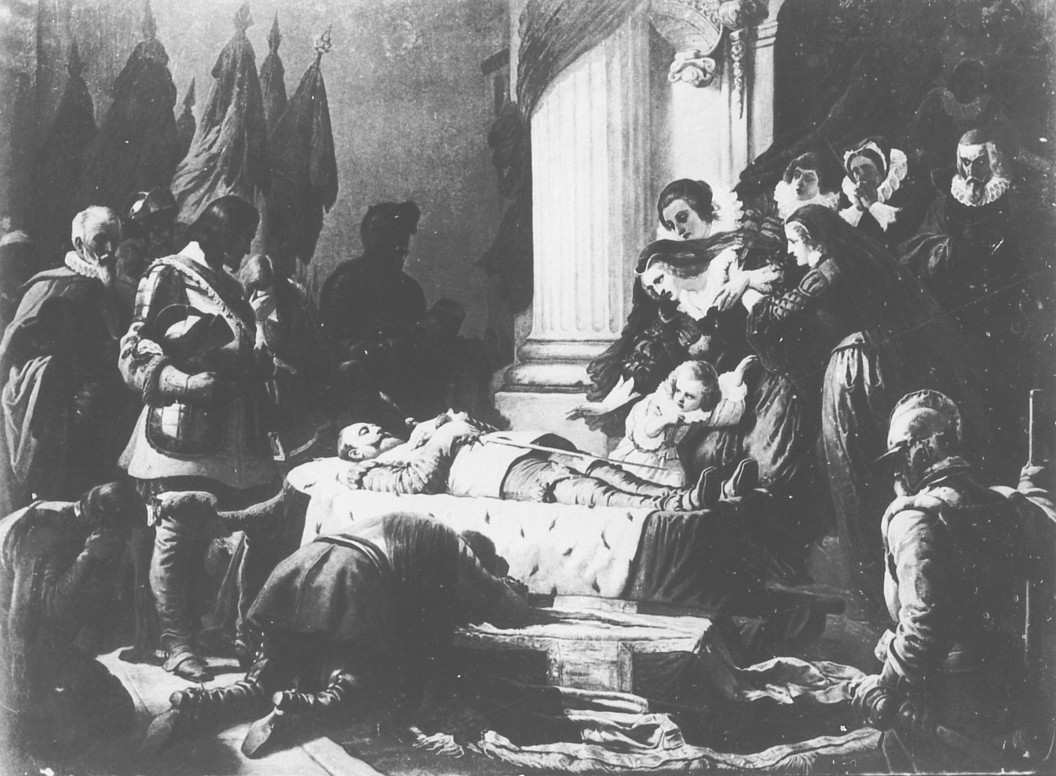
King Gustav Adolf on his Deathbed

Feodor Dietz (29 May 1813 – 18 November 1870) was a German historical and battle painter.

== Biography ==
He was born in Neunstetten, Baden. He studied in Karlsruhe under Karl and Rudolf Kuntz, and while there was greatly influenced by Feodor Ivanovitch. He also studied under Philipp von Foltz at the Munich Academy, and aided the latter in the decoration of the royal palace. In 1835, he executed his Death of Max Piccolomini, now in the Karlsruhe Gallery, which brought him considerable fame. He spent three years in Paris, coming under the influence of Horace Vernet and studying for a short time under Jean Alaux. He received the gold medal in the Salon of 1839.

He was appointed court painter at Karlsruhe, but moved to Munich. He took part as a volunteer in the First Schleswig War of 1848, and in 1862 was appointed professor of the newly founded School of Arts at Karlsruhe. He entered the army in 1870 in the Franco-Prussian War, and died in the service in Gray, France.

== Works ==
- Nocturnal Review (1853), acquired by Napoleon III of France.
- Destruction of Heidelberg by General Mélac (1856), in the Karlsruhe Gallery
- Flight of an American Family Across the Susquehanna, a romantic genre piece, Paris Exposition, 1867
- Blücher's March to Paris (1868), in the Berlin National Gallery

== See also ==
- List of German painters
