= Ernst Friedrich Diez =

German opera singer

Ernst Friedrich Diez or Dietz (17 March 1805 – December 1892) was a German lyric tenor who sang leading roles in the opera houses of Germany and Austria. He is most closely associated with the Munich Hofoper (now known as the Bavarian State Opera) where he was a member of the company from 1837 to 1849.

== Life and career ==
Diez was born in Waldkirch in the Black Forest region of Germany and trained as a singer in Vienna with Conradin Kreutzer. He began his career in Pressburg in 1826, moving to the Teatro Grande in Trieste in 1828. From 1830 he sang in Berlin and Mannheim before becoming a permanent member of the Munich Hofoper in 1837, although he continued to appear occasionally as guest singer in Vienna in both opera and lieder. In Munich he sang in the world premieres of two operas by Franz Paul Lachner—Alidia (1839) and Catharina Cornaro, Königin von Cypern (1841).

He married the young soprano Sophie Hartmann in 1841. They appeared together in several productions at the Hofoper, including the Munich premiere of Lortzing's Zar und Zimmermann—she as Marie and he as the Marquis de Chateauneuf. After his retirement from the stage in 1848, he dedicated himself to teaching young singers. Sophie Diez died in 1887 after a 40-year career at the Hofoper. Ernst Friedrich survived her by five years, dying in Munich at the age of 87. He is buried with his wife in the Alter Südfriedhof cemetery in Munich.
