= William Dietz =

William Dietz may refer to:

- William C. Dietz (1945–2026), science fiction author
- William Dietz (politician) (1778–1848), U.S. Representative from New York
- William Henry Dietz (1884–1964), American football player and coach
