= Franz Xaver Pentenrieder =

German composer (1813–1867)

Franz Xaver Pentenrieder (6 February 1813 – 17 July 1867) was a German composer of church music and operas.

Pentenrieder was born in Kaufbeuren, Bavaria and studied with Johann Nepomuk Kalcher and Joseph Hartmann Stuntz in Munich. He entered the choir of the Munich Frauenkirche and went on to become court Kapellmeister and organist to the King of Bavaria. He also served as the choir director at Ludwigskirche and répétiteur at the Munich Hofoper (now known as the Bavarian State Opera).

He spent the final years of his life in an insane asylum after serious injuries from a carriage accident left him physically and mentally disabled.

== Operas ==
- Die Nacht zu Paluzzi, romantic opera in two acts, premiered Königliches Hof- und National-Theater, Munich, 2 October 1840
- Das Haus ist zu verkaufen, comic singspiel in one act, premiered Leipzig, 1846
