= Harry Frederick Dietz =

American entomologist

Harry Frederick Dietz (8 December 1890, Indianapolis – 4 September 1954, Kennett Square PA) was an American economic entomologist. He worked for many years as an assistant entomologist for Indiana state and then headed the agricultural chemicals division of Du Pont Company.

Dietz was born in Indianapolis, Indiana, and became interested in plants at an early age after working with a florist. He studied at Shortridge High School, Wabash College and Montana State College. He then worked at the Montana Experiment Station on the vectors of Rocky Mountain Spotted Fever. He was forced to pause studies and return home to care for sick parents. He then went to Butler College and graduated with a BA in zoology (1914) and then worked as a deputy state entomologist in Indiana. He became involved in spare time studies on the Coccidae. In 1916 he moved to the Federal Horticultural Board working on the pests of fruit crops in the Panama canal area, particularly the citrus black fly. From 1919 he worked on plant quarantine at Washington and collaborated with C. L Marlatt and others. He then moved back to Indiana as assistant state entomologist working with Frank Wallace. He joined Ohio State University to continue studies in 1929 and received an MA in 1930 and a PhD in 1931. In 1932 he began to work for Du Pont Company with the Grasselli chemicals department working on insecticides. From 1949 he managed the agricultural chemicals section and oversaw the development of dithiocarbamates, copper fungicides, methoxychlor and several herbicides.

Dietz was interested in gardening in his spare time which he shared with his wife Dorothy Hills (m. 1914). Dietz died from a heart attack at home in Kennett Square, Pennsylvania. He was survived by his wife and four children.

He wrote:-

- with Morrison, H. The Coccidae or Scale Insects of Indiana, Eighth Ann. Rep. Indiana State Ent., April, pp. 250–258 (1916).
- with Thomas Elliot Snyder Biological Notes on the Termites of the Canal Zone and Adjoining Parts of the Republic of Panama, Journal of Agriculture (1923)
- with J. Zetek The blackfly of citrus and other subtropical plants. USDA Bulletin 885: 1-55 (1924).
- with Thomas Elliot Snyder Biological notes on the Canal Zone and adjoining parts of the Republic of Panama. Journal of Agriculture 26(7): 279-302 9 (1924).

== Other sources ==
- Osborn, H. 1937 Fragments of Entomological History Including Some Personal Recollections of Men and Events. Columbus, Ohio, Published by the Author 1 1–394.
