= Jim Dietz =

Jim or James Dietz may refer to:

- James Dietz (born 1946), contemporary artist
- Jim Dietz (baseball) (born 1939), American baseball player and coach
- Jim Dietz (rower) (born 1949), American rower and rowing coach
