= Kastelburg =

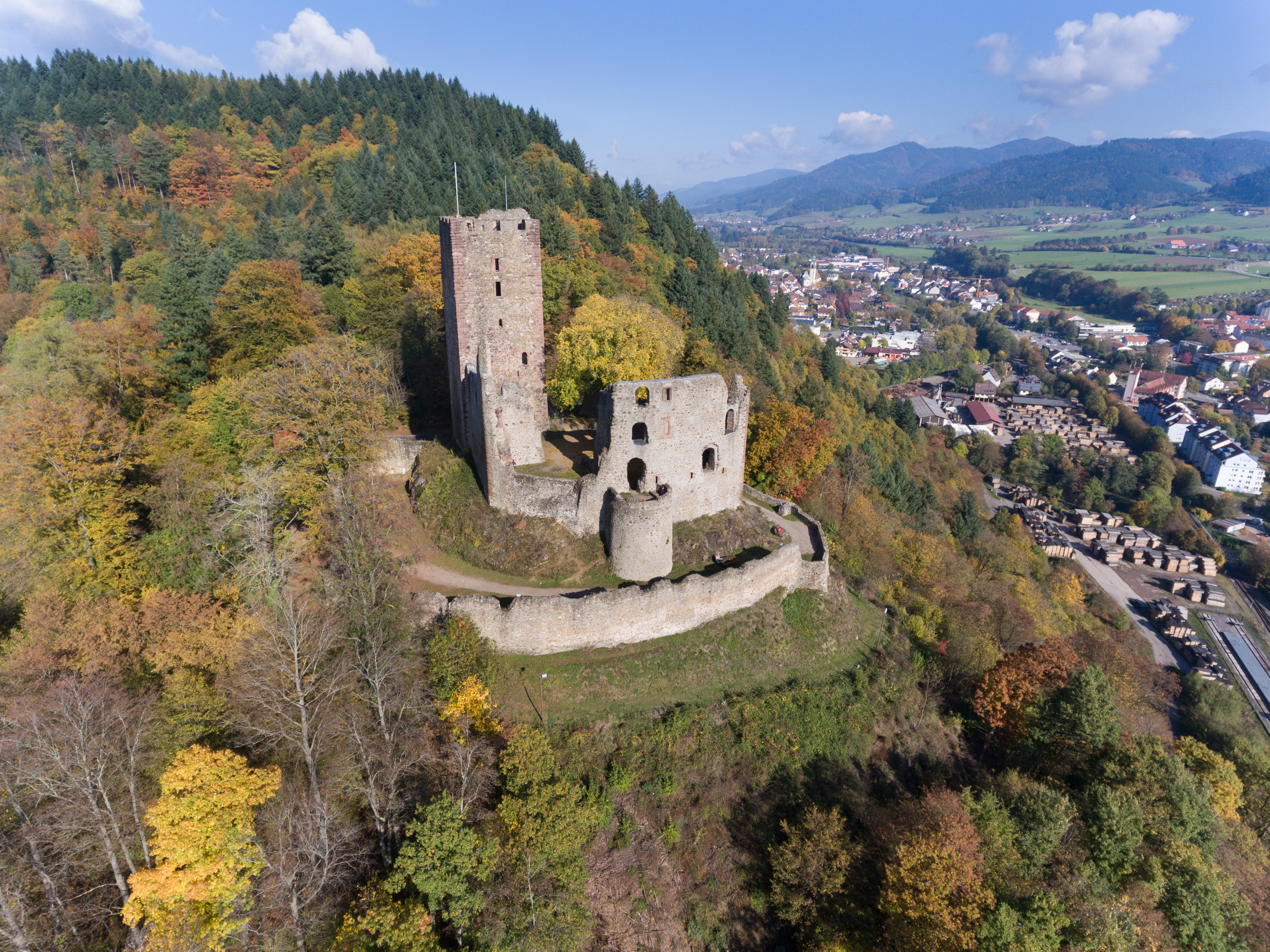
- Kastelburg from the air

Highest point
- Elevation: 363.3 m (1,192 ft)
- Coordinates: 48°05′51″N 7°57′28″E

Geography
- Location within Baden-Württemberg Location within Germany
- Location: Baden-Württemberg, Germany
- Parent range: Black Forest

The Kastelburg is a ruined castle above Waldkirch in the district Emmendingen in Baden-Württemberg. It stands on a hill about 100 meters (330 feet) above the center of Waldkirch in Breisgau.

== History ==
The Kastel castle was built between 1260 and 1270 by the Lords of Schwarzenberg. Like the Schwarzenburg on the opposite side of the valley its purpose was to defend the town Waldkirch and to control the trade route through the Elz valley.

The first inhabitant of the castle was Johann I of Schwarzenberg. The Schwarzenbergs died out already in 1345 and the castle was sold to Martin Malterer from Freiburg who fell in 1386 in the Battle of Sempach. In 1429 the castle was passed on to Berthold of Staufen.

In the Thirty Years' War the castle was destroyed by troops of the Kaiser on 14 March 1634 so that it did not fall into the hands of the advancing Swedish troops.

In recent years attempts have been made to conserve the edificial structure of the ruin that is standing romantically above the historic center of Waldkirch (Action Kastelburg).
