= Henry A. Dietz =

Henry A. Dietz is an American professor and author. He is a professor emeritus and University Distinguished Teaching Professor of Government at University of Texas at Austin, and a member of the university's Academy of Distinguished Teachers. His books concern governance and poverty in Peru.

== Education ==
Dietz has a 1964 bachelor's degree in English from Miami University, Ohio. After serving in the Peace Corps in Peru from 1964 to 1966, he received a master's degree in political science from Indiana University in 1968, and completed his Ph.D. in political science at Stanford University in 1975. He has been described as an expert on Latin America.

== Books ==
Dietz is the author of:

- Poverty and Problem-Solving under Military Rule: The Urban Poor in Lima, Peru (University of Texas Press, 1980)
- Urban Poverty, Political Participation, and the State: Lima 1970–1990 (University of Pittsburgh Press, 1998)
- Population Growth, Social Segregation, and Voting Behavior in Lima, Peru, 1940–2016 (University of Notre Dame Press, 2019)

His edited volumes include:

- Ethnicity, Integration, and the Military (edited with Jerrold Elkin and Maurice Roumani, Westview Press, 1991)
- Urban Elections in Democratic Latin America (edited with Gil Shidlo, SR Books, 1998)
- Capital City Politics in Latin America (edited with David J. Myers, Lynne Rienner, 2002)
