= Joella =

Joella may refer to:

== People ==
- Joella (drag queen), American drag queen
- Joella Gipson, American musician and mathematician
- Joella Lloyd, Antiguan sprinter
- Joella Yoder, Dutch science historian

== Other ==
- Joella Productions, British television production company
- 726 Joëlla, minor planet
