= Projection clock =

A projection clock (also called ceiling clock) is an analogue or digital clock equipped with a projector that creates an enlarged image of the clock face or display on any surface usable as a projection screen, most often the ceiling.

The clock can be placed almost anywhere if only the projected image must be seen. The image generated by most projection clocks is large enough that a nearsighted person can see it from a distance without glasses or contact lenses. Clocks usually have a conventional display on their body, in addition to the projector,

Projection clocks are also used in advertising and merchandising. High-brightness analogue projection clocks can superimpose a business' logo on top of the clock face, while there are low-brightness projection clocks designed for home use that project, for example, a logo in addition to the time.

Some projection clocks are radio-controlled, synchronising with a broadcast time standard and always displaying the right time without the need to set them. They may also display other information such as temperature and humidity.

== History ==
Projection clocks were patented at least twice: once in 1909, and another time in 1940. Both patents have expired.

Early projection clocks were universally analogue but with the widespread adoption of digital clocks, digital projection clocks became the standard.

== Technology ==
A projection clock usually needs a backlight like an incandescent bulb or LED.

There are low-brightness and high-brightness clocks. While the projection created by low-brightness clocks can be viewed only in a darkened room, high-brightness ones can also be viewed in bright light or daylight.

=== Low-brightness projection clocks ===
Most modern projection clocks have a red LED-based projector. Additional optional features not specific to projection clocks are the inclusion of an LED or LCD in addition to the projector, an alarm function, and synchronisation to a broadcast time standard.

=== High-brightness projection clocks ===
Modern high-brightness projection clocks are in most cases analogue and have a halogen bulb backlight. In most cases, they use a set of rotating and fixed transparent discs with hands and a face. An LCD is integrated into some clocks to combine analogue and digital information on the projected image.

Projectors used in projection clocks are similar to other projectors and use the same optical principles. They usually use lenses although some projectors use the principle of shadow theatre, vector or raster scanning.
