= Doll's head clock =

Doll's head clocks, often known by their French name tête de poupée, were popular during the last quarter of the seventeenth century. They are named for their profile which resembles a head and shoulders. A doll's head clock is almost always ornamented with Boulle marquetry.
