= Oil-lamp clock =

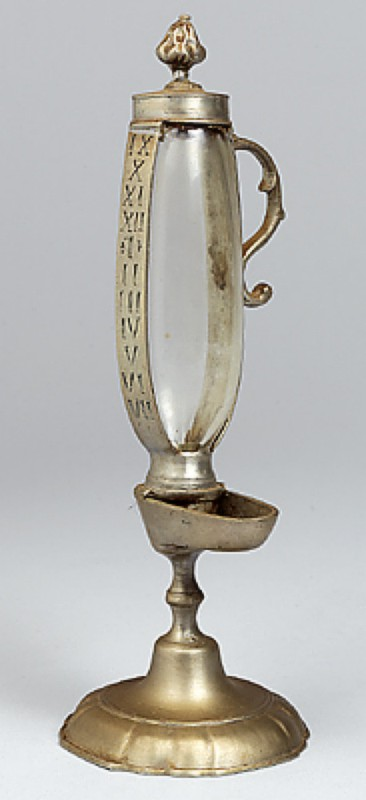
18th Century oil-lamp clock

Oil-lamp clocks, also known as lamp clocks or silent clocks are a type of clock consisting of a graduated glass reservoir to hold oil - typically whale oil, which burned cleanly and evenly - supplying the fuel for a built-in lamp. As the level in the reservoir dropped, it provided a rough measure of the passage of time and the light source allowed the clock to be read at night time. Oil lamps were used for time keeping as early as the 15th Century.

== See also ==
- Candle clock
- Water clock
- Hourglass
