= Flying pendulum clock =

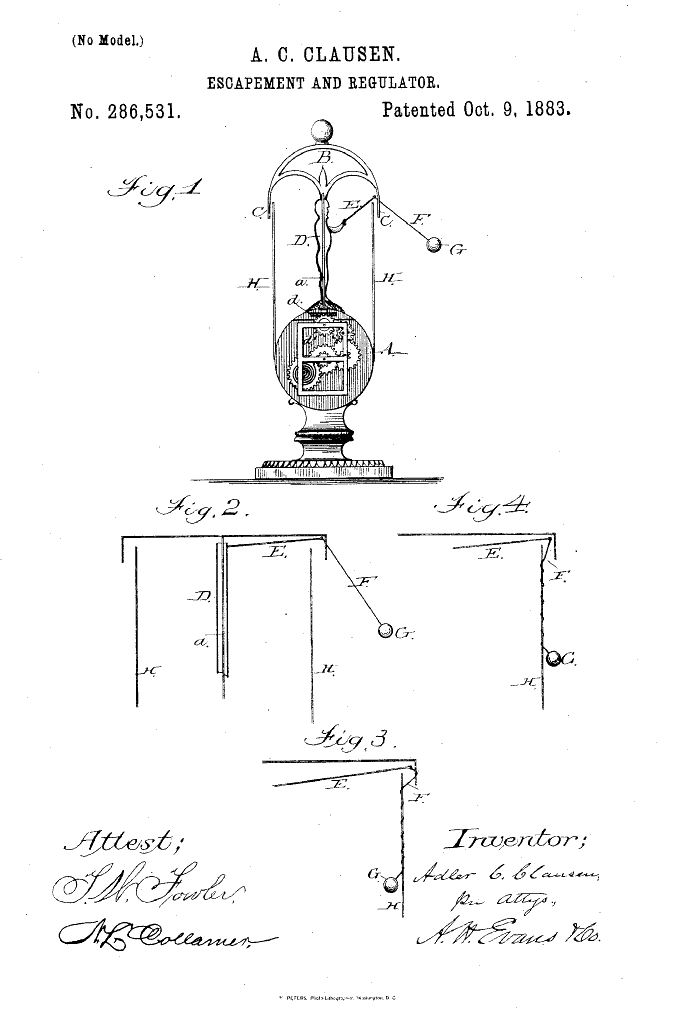
Picture of the mechanism

A flying pendulum clock is a clock that uses a flying pendulum escapement mechanism. A small metal ball, connected by string, wraps around one brass post, then unwinds before repeating on the other brass post.

The flying pendulum clock was invented and patented in 1883 by Adler Christian Clausen and J. C. Slafter in Minneapolis. The clock was later called the Ignatz Flying pendulum clock after a character in the Krazy Kat comic. It has been called "the craziest clock in the world" due to the motion of the escapement.
