= Department of Defense master clock =

Atomic master clock for the U.S. Department of Defense

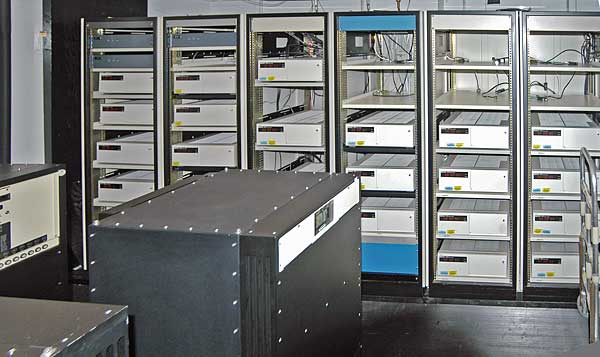
The master atomic clock ensemble at the U.S. Naval Observatory in Washington D.C., which provides the time standard for the U.S. Department of Defense. The rack mounted units in the background are caesium beam clocks. The black units in the foreground are hydrogen maser standards.

The Department of Defense master clock is the atomic master clock to which time and frequency measurements for the United States Department of Defense are referenced.

Located in Washington D.C., the U.S. Naval Observatory master clock is designated as the "DOD Master Clock". It is one of the two standard time and frequency references for the U.S. Government in accordance with Federal Standard 1002-A. The other standard time and frequency reference for the U.S. Government is the National Institute of Standards and Technology (NIST) master clock.

The U.S. Naval Observatory also maintains an alternate clock designated "USNO Alternate Master Clock" at Schriever Space Force Base, Colorado.
