= Earth clock =

Earth Clock
- Developer(s): Arjan Dikhoff
- Initial release: 7 February 2004; 21 years ago
- Stable release: 1.4.1 / 21 March 2004; 21 years ago
- Repository: sourceforge.net/projects/earthclock/
- Written in: Python
- Operating system: Windows 2000, XP
- Size: 4.3 MB
- Available in: English
- License: GPL
- Website: earthclock.xentax.com

Earth Clock is a computer program that will display a map of the Earth showing the zones where is day and where is night. It was released by Xentax Foundation on February 7, 2004, and programmed by Arjan Dikhoff. Its source code can be found at SourceForge.
