= Balloon clock =

Clock design

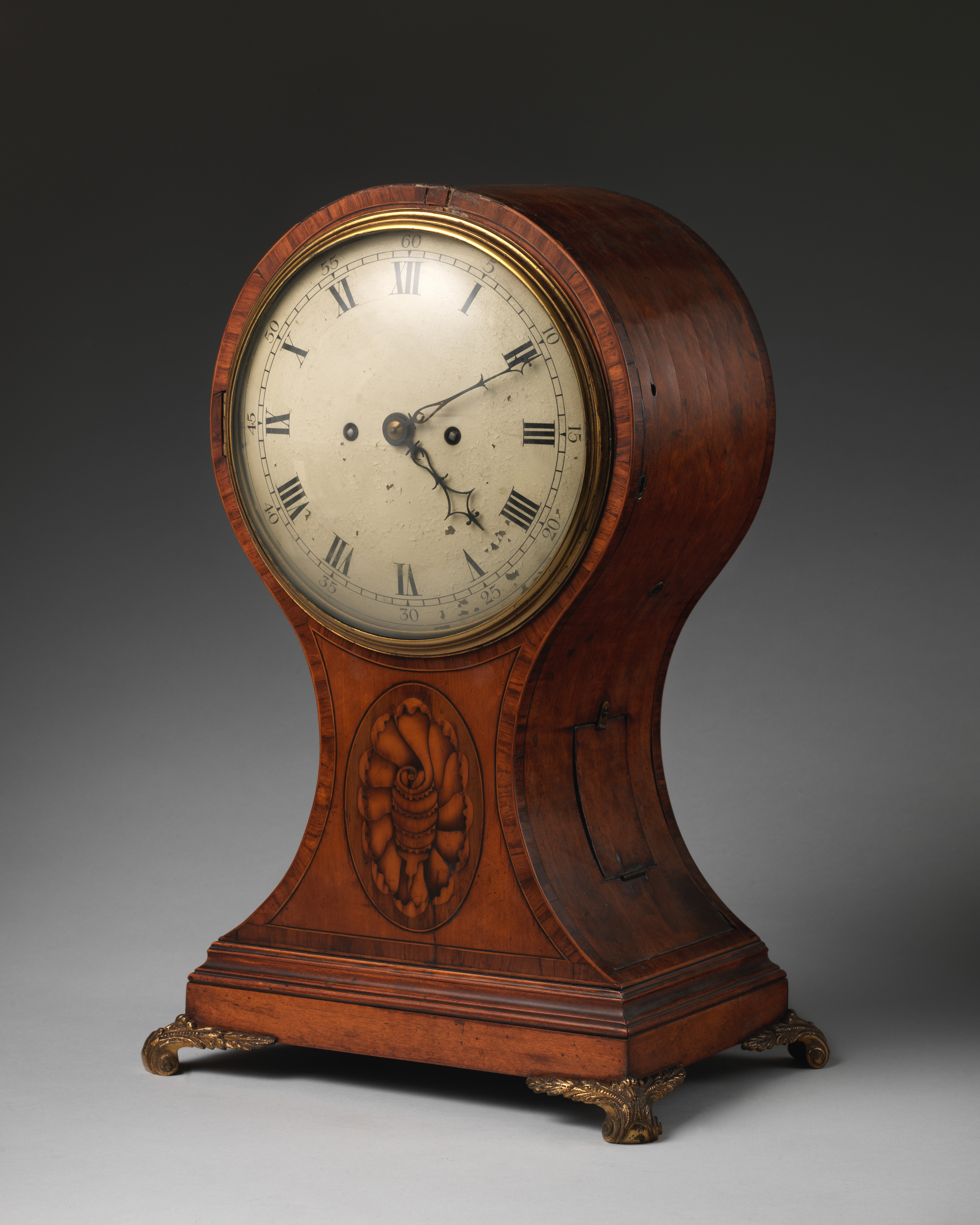
A balloon clock

A balloon clock is a bracket clock with a waisted or balloon-shaped case. It was popular in England from the late 18th to the early 19th century.

It is believed that balloon clock is derived from French styles that are usually of satinwood or mahogany with a convex or flat dial.

== See also ==
- Banjo clock
- Carriage clock
- Lantern clock
