= Joella Yoder =

Dutch science historian

Joella Gerstmeyer Yoder (born 1944) is a historian of science. She is an expert in the work of Christiaan Huygens.

== Life ==
Yoder gained her Ph.D. in 1985 from the University of Wisconsin. In 1986, she embarked on the project of cataloguing the manuscripts and letters of Huygens, many of them collected at the University of Leiden. It would take her over a quarter of a century to complete this cataloguing project.

Yoder was married to Bill Yoder, in memory of whom she donated to Village Theatre.

== Works ==
- Unrolling Time: Christiaan Huygens and the Mathematization of Nature. Cambridge University Press, 1989. ISBN 9780521341400.
- Christiaan Huygens' Great Treasure, Tractrix 3 (1991), pp. 1–13
- 'The Archives of Christiaan Huygens and his Editors', in Michael Hunter, ed., Archives of the Scientific Revolution. Woodbridge, 1998.
- The Letters of Christiaan Huygens, Revue d'histoire des sciences Année, 56(1), 2003, pp. 135–143.
- A Catalogue of the Manuscripts of Christiaan Huygens including a concordance with his Oeuvres Complètes. BRILL, 2013. ISBN 9789004235656.
