= German Clock Road =

Holiday route in the Black Forest, Germany

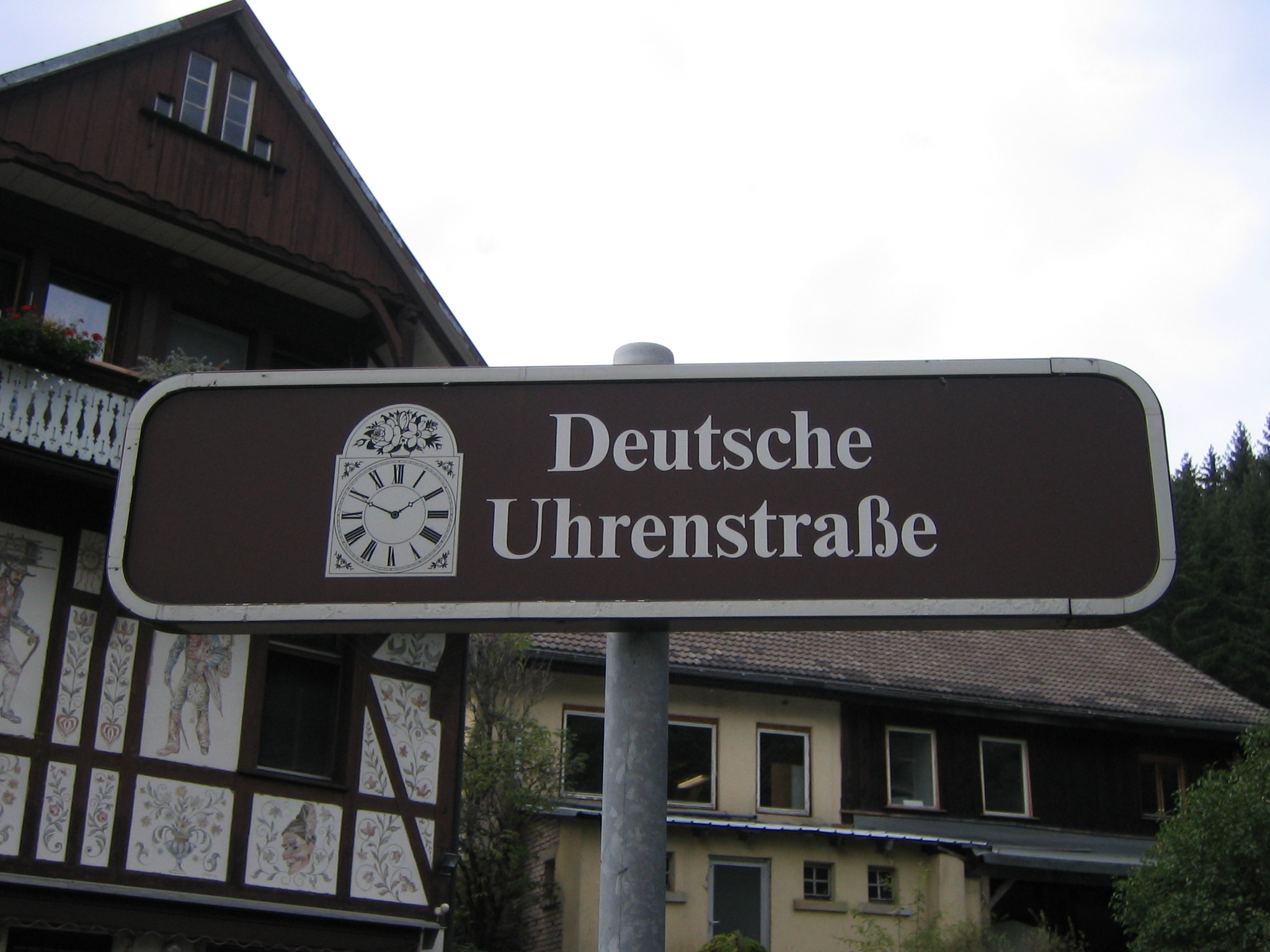
Sign in Lenzkirch

The German Clock Road (German: Deutsche Uhrenstraße) or German Clock Route is a holiday route that runs from the Central Black Forest through the Southern Black Forest to the Baar region and thus links the centres of Black Forest clock manufacturing. It is about 320 kilometres (200 mi) long.

== Towns, villages and counties ==
The towns and villages along the route (in alphabetic order) are Deißlingen, Eisenbach, Furtwangen, Gütenbach, Hornberg, Königsfeld, Lauterbach, Lenzkirch, Niedereschach, Rottweil, Schönwald, Schonach, Schramberg, Simonswald, St. Georgen, St. Märgen, St. Peter, Titisee-Neustadt, Triberg, Trossingen, Villingen-Schwenningen, Vöhrenbach, Waldkirch.

The counties through which the German Clock Road runs are Schwarzwald-Baar, Breisgau-Hochschwarzwald, Rottweil, Tuttlingen, Emmendingen and Ortenau.

== Attractions en route ==
=== With a clock theme ===
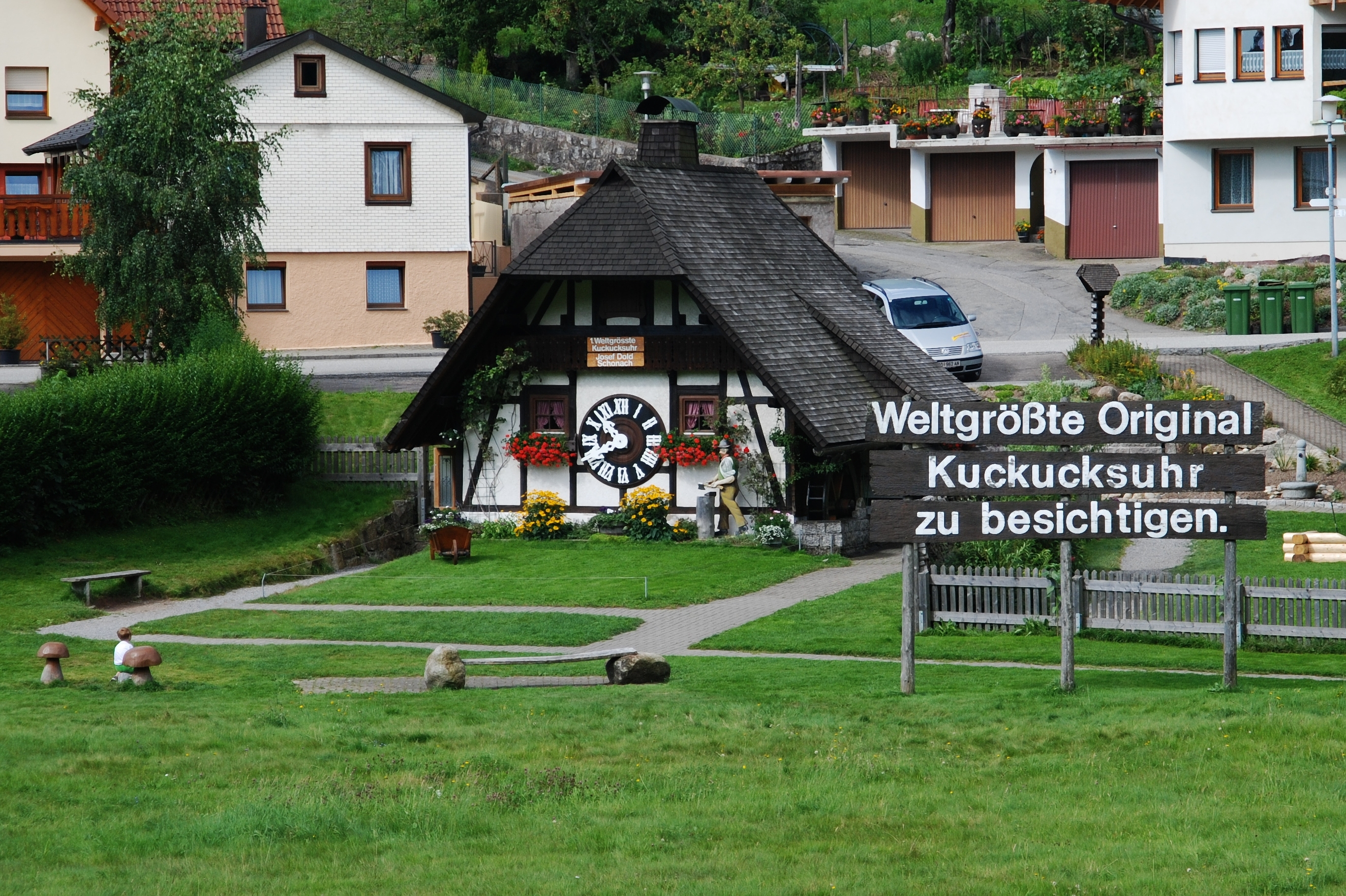
One of the world's largest cuckoo clocks in Schonach

- German Clock Museum in Furtwangen im Schwarzwald with the largest collection of clocks in Germany
- Museum of Clockmaking in Villingen-Schwenningen which focusses on the history of clock manufacture
- Largest cuckoo clock in the world in Schonach im Schwarzwald
- Gütenbach Village Museum with many clocks by local clockmakers
- St. Märgen's Abbey Museum, which portrays the development of the Black Forest clock and Black Forest clock dealers abroad
- ErfinderZeiten Museum in the car and clock world in Schramberg with an emphasis on the Schramberg clock factory of Junghans as well as the development of the Black Forest clock industry in general

=== Other attractions ===
- Triberg Waterfalls, which is one of the highest and best known waterfalls in Germany
- Black Forest Railway, a technically unusual mountain railway with 40 tunnels
- Titisee, the largest natural lake in the Black Forest
- Baroque churches and abbeys in St. Märgen and St. Peter
- German Harmonica Museum in Trossingen

== Literature ==
- Rüdiger Gramsch: Wo die Stunde schlägt. Mit Hansy Vogt unterwegs auf der Deutschen Uhrenstraße. Silberburg Verlag GmbH, Tübingen 2017. ISBN 978-3-8425-2010-3. (Stationen an der Deutschen Uhrenstraße). (in German)

== See also ==
- Black Forest Clock Association
- List of largest cuckoo clocks
