= Dorf- und Uhrenmuseum Gütenbach =

Museum in Germany

Coordinates: 48°02′50″N 8°08′23″E

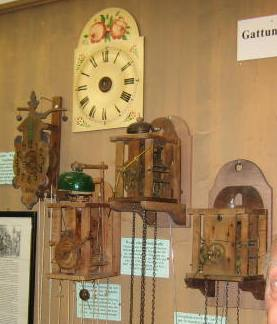
Dorf- und Uhrenmuseum Gütenbach: Display on the history of the wooden movement Black Forest clock

Dorf- und Uhrenmuseum Gütenbach, Baden-Württemberg

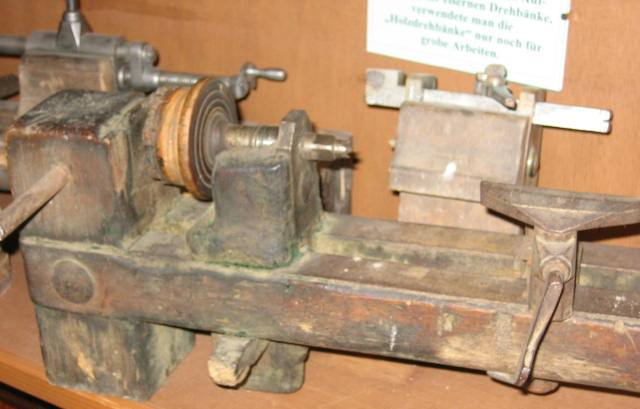
Dorf- und Uhrenmuseum Gütenbach: A homemade wooden lathe used in making wooden wheelblanks for clock movements

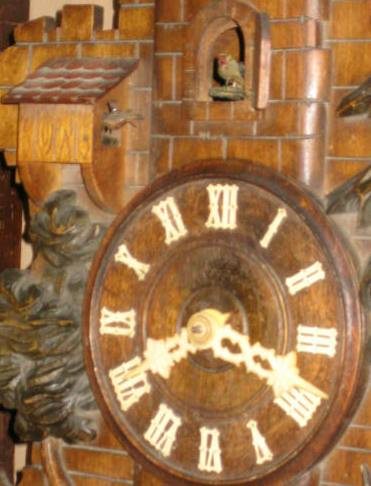
Dorf- und Uhrenmuseum Gütenbach: A unique double cuckoo clock featuring a mother cuckoo and a baby cuckoo, both articulated and calling out the hours

The Dorf- und Uhrenmuseum Gütenbach (English: Village and Clock Museum Gütenbach) is located in the village of Gütenbach, one of the historic centers of homebased manufacturing of clocks in the Black Forest region of Germany near the town of Furtwangen im Schwarzwald. It features primarily permanent and temporary exhibits on the local history of clockmaking, focussing on the history of making wooden clock movements. There also is a smaller general display on local history and rural living conditions in the 18th and 19th century.

Highlights include:

- An overview of the history of the wooden black forest clock movement
- A unique collection of homemade tools, jigs and fixtures for making clock movements
- A broad collection of one of kind black forest clocks, including organ clocks and cuckoo clocks, many made within the village of Gütenbach

The Museum is located in the former schoolhouse of the village, next to the church, on a hill above the village center.

== Similar museums ==
In the same region:

- Deutsches Uhrenmuseum, in Furtwangen im Schwarzwald
- Uhrenindustriemuseum, in Villingen-Schwenningen
- Schwarzwaldmuseum, in Triberg
- Stadtmuseum, in Schramberg

Outside Germany:

- Irish Museum of Time, in Waterford

== See also ==
- Horology
