= Hochschule Furtwangen University =

German university

Furtwangen University
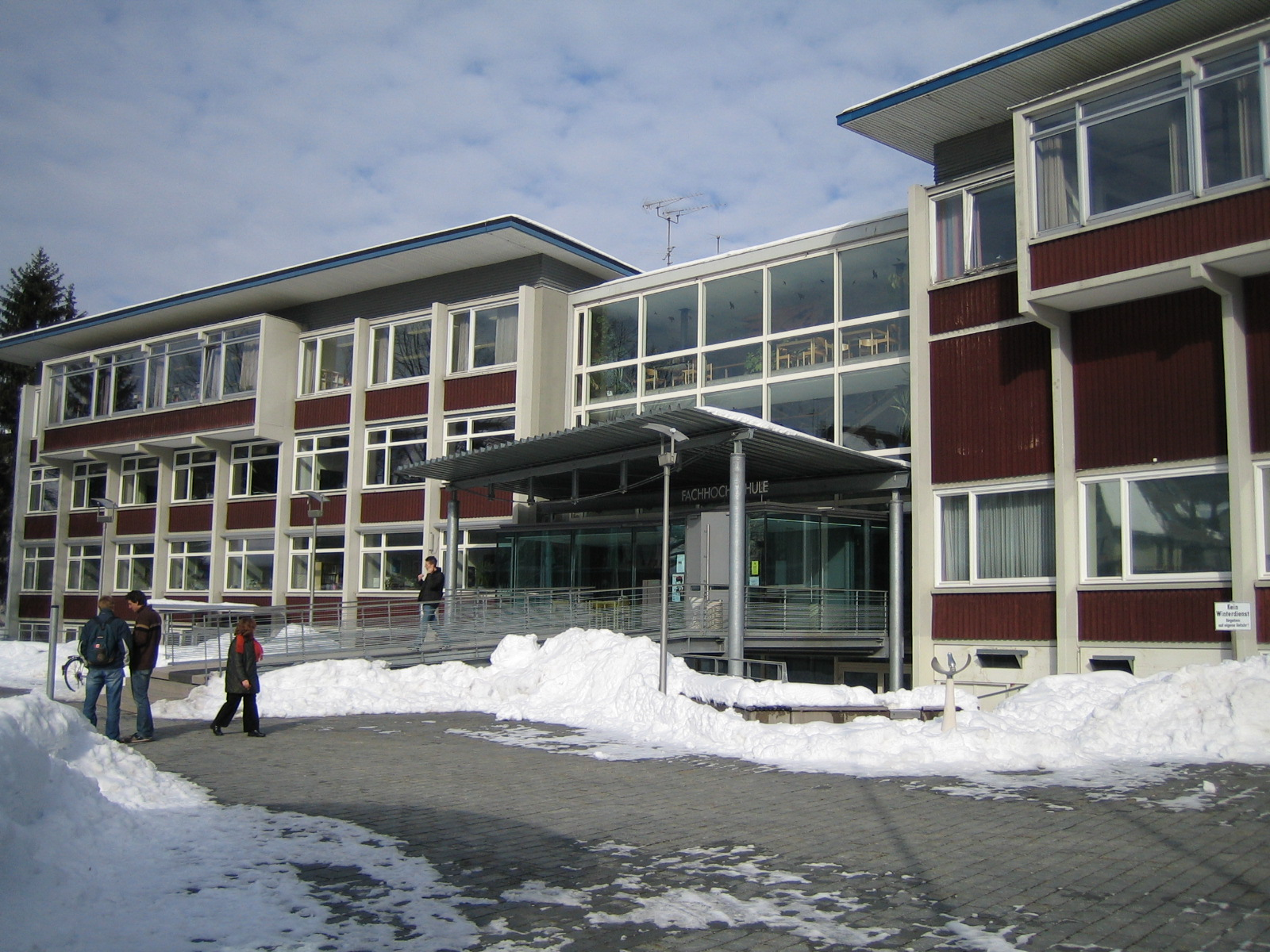
- Main building
- Type: Public University
- Established: 5 March 1850; 176 years ago
- President: Dr. Alexandra Bormann
- Students: 5902
- Location: Furtwangen, Germany; 48.0515°N 8.2077°E
- Colours: Green and White
- Website: www.hs-furtwangen.de/en/
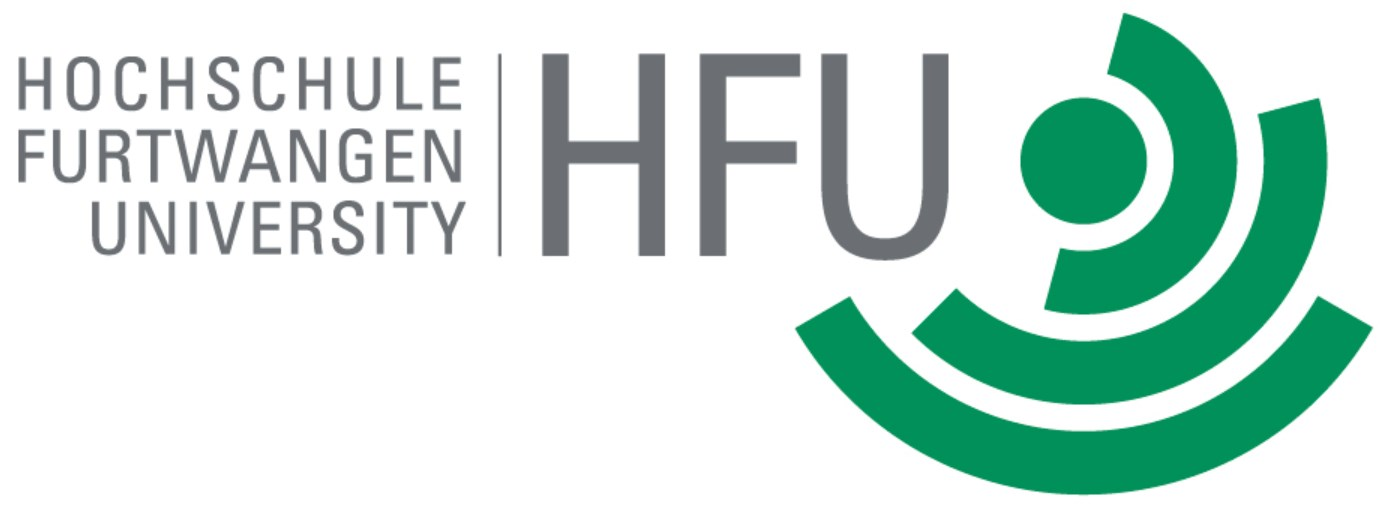

Furtwangen University (HFU) is a German University of applied science with its main location in Furtwangen im Schwarzwald, Baden-Württemberg, Germany and two more campuses in Villingen-Schwenningen and Tuttlingen. The HFU is part of the "International Lake Constance University Network" (IBH) as well as part of the Franco-German University (FGU).

It offers degree programmes in the health sciences, computer science, engineering, international business, digital media, business information systems and business administration and engineering.

== History ==
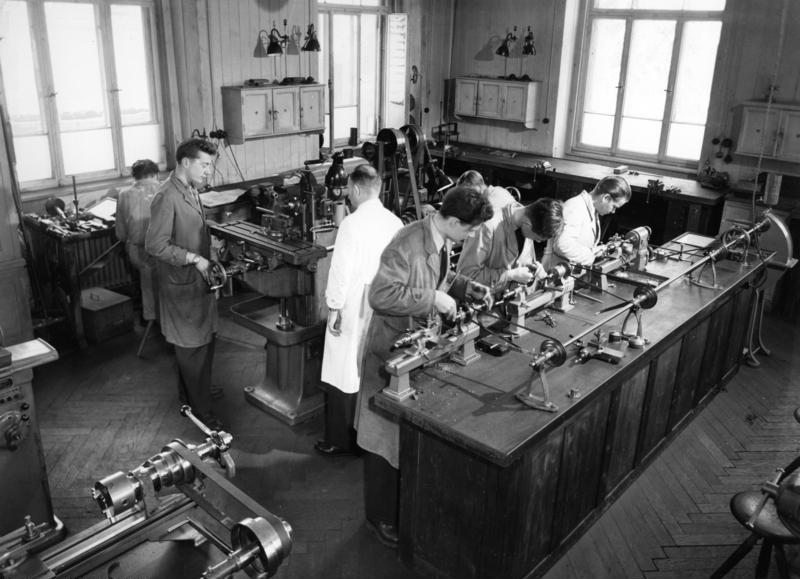
The State Engineering School, 1954

Furtwangen University emerged from the first German School of Clockmaking in Furtwangen in the Black Forest. The school was founded in 1850 by the engineer Robert Gerwig. The German Clock Museum, the largest German clock collection (founded by Robert Gerwig as a display collection), is still a part of the University.

After the Second World War, the Furtwangen School of Clockmaking was divided into two branches: a vocational school (today the Robert Gerwig School, which still houses the Watchmaking School today) and the State Engineering School for Precision Engineering, which became Furtwangen University of Applied Sciences (FHF) with the introduction of universities of applied sciences in 1971.

The founding director of the engineering school was Friedrich Aßmus. After initially concentrating teaching and research in Furtwangen on engineering sciences, in the 1970s the range of study programmes was expanded to include computer science, business information systems, business and digital media. In 1997, with the amendment of the State University Law of the State of Baden-Württemberg, it was first renamed "Hochschule für Technik und Wirtschaft" and later "Hochschule Furtwangen".

Currently, the university is headed by Dr.Alexandra Bormann who took office in March 2024, replacing Prof. Dr. Rolf Schofer, who had been the President of HFU since 2006. His predecessor was Rainer Scheithauer. Scheithauer in turn took over the office in 1998 from Walter Zahradnik (term of office from 1985 to 1998).

== Structure ==
The President is assisted by three Vice-presidents and the Head of Administration, currently Andrea Linke. The University Executive is responsible for the development of the university, proposing measures to raise the profile of the university and to strengthen its performance and competitiveness.

The three Vice-presidents are currently Prof. Dr.hum.biol. Ulrike Salat, Prof. Dr.-Ing. Hans-Georg Enkler and Prof. Dr. Christoph Reich.

=== Furtwangen Campus ===
Furtwangen Campus is the university’s original location where degree programmes from the following faculties are offered:

- Faculty I Computer Science & Applications
- Faculty II Engineering & Technology
- Faculty III Health, Medical & Life Sciences
- Faculty IV Business, Design & Media

=== Schwenningen Campus ===
Schwenningen Campus was established in 1988 and is located on the site of the former Kienzle clock factory. Degree programmes from the following faculties are offered here:

- Faculty I Computer Science & Applications
- Faculty II Engineering & Technology
- Faculty III Health, Medical & Life Sciences
- Faculty IV Business, Design & Media

=== Tuttlingen Campus ===
Tuttlingen Campus began operations in 2009 with about 121 students. the following faculties offer degree programmes here:

- Faculty II Engineering & Technology
- Faculty IV Business, Design & Media

On the Tuttlingen Campus students are trained in medical engineering, mechatronics and digital production, engineering psychology and materials technology and manufacturing. In addition to four Bachelor's programmes, the Faculty offers four Master's programmes in Applied Materials Science, Human Factors, Mechatronic Systems and Medical Devices - Regulatory Affairs, as well as a pre-study Technical Orientation Prep Course and Industrial Studies / Study Plus cooperative models.

The campus is located on the former site of Henke-Sass, Wolf, which was built in 1906 and 1954. The brick building was renovated for over €10.5 million and was officially inaugurated on 8 October 2009. In addition to the modernisation and an extension of the building, direct access to the central bus station (ZOB) was created. Possible extensions are the former building of the Ludwig-Uhland-Realschule or directly opposite another brick building from the Art Nouveau period.

A special feature of the Tuttlingen Campus is the so-called "Tuttlingen Model" the cooperation between university, City, Region and industry. The practice-oriented, cooperative study programmes are supported by more than 100 local medical technology companies. A specially set up Friends Association, the Hochschulcampus Tuttlingen Förderverein e. V. has accelerated the development of the campus.

The so-called Tuttlingen concept includes close cooperation with commercial enterprises, which guarantee permanent practical relevance through lecturers, demonstrations in companies, internships and the supervision of scientific work. The companies have a say in the design and operation of teaching. In total there is an annual financial support of €2.5 million from the business community. The Tuttlingen Region contributes €200,000. The Campus' slogan is "Powered by Industry".

=== Freiburg Study Center ===
In December 2016, the Physiotherapy course moved into the new study centre in Freiburg, where part of the physiotherapy training will take place. The study centre is located in Konrad-Goldmann-Straße 7 in the Freiburg district Wiehre and is easily accessible by public transport.

On the first and second floors there are both classrooms and offices for the staff. An expansion in the same building is in planning.

=== Rottweil Research Center ===
The Research Centre in Rottweil was reopened in March 2016. It is located in premises of the former Rottweil gunpowder factory, a location which housed several powder mills during the Thirty Years' War. It offers space for the innovative plasma coating technologies of Faculty II Engineering & Technology, and a hall for mechanical engineering and industry 4.0 with state-of-the-art robots, automation technology and simulation.

In addition to university research with partly international research projects in the field of coatings for medical technology, there are also internships for master's students in the micromedical technology, advanced precision engineering and technical physician programmes.

The facilities and equipment of the Research Center are also available to students of the bachelor's degree programmes for student research projects, project internships and bachelor's theses.

Since October 2023, the fee-based English-language master's degree programme “Engineering and Business Management” has been offered in Rottweil with 15 study places.

== Degree programmes ==
Since Winter Semester 2001/2002, the entire range of programmes has been converted to bachelor's and master's degrees in accordance with the Bologna process. The university offers degree programmes in four faculties. A first professionally qualifying bachelor's degree can be obtained within seven semesters, which enables graduates to successfully start their careers. This includes an internship semester in a company and the academic thesis. The following table lists all study programmes by faculty (See also here):

Faculty I Computer Science & Applications

Bachelor

- Artificial Intelligence and Robotics (BSc)
- Business Administration and Engineering – Engineering Management (BEng)

(In partnership with the Chamber of Industry and Commerce (IHK))

- Business Administration and Engineering - Marketing and Sales (BSc)
- Business Administration and Engineering - Product Engineering (BEng)
- Business Information Systems - Business Data Science (BSc)
- Business Information Systems - Digital Business and eCommerce (BSc)
- Computer Science (BSc)
- Computerscience in Media (BSc)
- Cyber Security (BSc)
- Games & Immersive Media (BSc)
- International Business Information Systems (BSc)
- IT Product Management (BSc)

Master

- Artificial Intelligence and Data Science for Digital Business Management (MSc)
- Business Administration and Engineering - Sales & Service Engineering (MBA)
- Business Application Architectures (MSc)
- Business Consulting (MSc)
- Computer Science (MSc)
- Computerscience in Media (MSc)
- Innovation Engineering (MSc)
- Mobile Systems (MSc)
- Precision Manufacturing and Management (MSc)

Faculty II Engineering & Technology

Bachelor

- Applied Biology (Bsc)
- Applied Materials Sciences (Bsc)
- Business Administration and Engineering - Marketing and Sales (BSc)
- Business Administration and Engineering - Product Engineering (BEng)
- Electrical Engineering (BSc)
- Engineering Psychology (BSc)
- Information Communications Systems (BSc)
- International Engineering (BSc)
- Mechanical Engineering and Mechatronics (BSc)
- Mechatronics and Digital Production (BSc)
- Medical Engineering - Clinical Technologies (BSc)
- Medical Engineering - Technologies and Development Processes (BSc)

Master

- Advanced Precision Engineering (MSc)
- Applied Materials Sciences (MSc)
- Biomedical Engineering (MSc)
- Engineering and Business Management (MSc)
- Human Factors (MSc)
- Innovation Engineering (MSc)
- Mechatronic Systems (MSc)
- Medical Devices - Regulatory Affairs (MSc)
- Micromedical Engineering (MSc)
- Smart Systems (MSc)
- Technical Physician (MSc)

Faculty III Health, Medical & Life Sciences

Bachelor

- Applied Biology (BSc)
- Applied Health Sciences (BSc)
- Medical Engineering - Clinical Technologies (BSc)
- Midwifery Science (BSc)
- Molecular and Technical Medicine (BSc)
- Physician Assistant (BSc)
- Physiotherapy (BSc)
- Physiotherapy Plus (BSc)
- Security & Safety Engineering (BSc)

Master

- Applied Health Promotion (MSc)
- Biomedical Engineering (MSc)
- Interdisciplinary Health Promotion (MSc)
- Precision Medicine Diagnostics (MSc)
- Risk, Reliability and Safety Engineering (MSc)
- Technical Physician (MSc)

Faculty IV Business, Design & Media

Bachelor

- Business Law (LLB)
- Business Management and Psychology (BA)
- Computer Science in Media (BSc)
- Games & Immersive Media (BA)
- International Business (BA)
- International Business Management (BA)
- International Engineering (BSc)
- Media Design (BA)
- Music Design (BMus)

(In partnership with the Trossingen University of Music)

- Online Media (BSc)

Master

- Computer Science in Media (MSc)
- Executive Master of International Business Management (MBA)
- Interactive Media Design (MA)
- International Business Management (MBA)
- International Management (MSc)

=== Continuing Education ===
The university has been active in academic continuing education since 1996. Initially it offered online courses in the fields of media, computer science and business under the so called service tele-akademie. Since 2010, it has expanded its range of courses to include attendance training and has bundled its continuing education activities in what is now called the HFU Academy.

The HFU Academy offers continuing education courses that enable further education after initial professional experience. The topics offered are based on the profile of the university and are assigned to the fields of computer science, engineering, business, digital media, health and other key qualifications. The variety of offered courses ranges from seminars and workshops lasting one or more days, online and blended learning to open courses or in-house training.

A special focus is also on services related to learning. Master's programmes open up new career perspectives and are designed as research or application-oriented postgraduate courses. They usually consist of three semesters and can be taken either directly after a first degree course or, after a certain amount of professional experience, as part-time studies while working.

=== International Orientation ===
Students have the opportunity to study at one of 140 partner universities worldwide. Stays abroad and internships are an integral part of studying at the HFU. Through numerous activities in international teams with exciting tasks and projects, students experience team spirit and improve their intercultural competence. In addition, many courses of study are held in small, multinational groups.

In winter of 2018, Furtwangen University and Lakehead University decided to enter into a far-reaching collaboration. For HFU, this is already the third partnership in Canada, which has already been established with the University of New Brunswick and the University of Prince Edward Island. Michael Lederer, the Vice-president for International Affairs and Continuing Education at HFU at the time, and Rüdiger Kukral of the Furtwangen Internship Placement Service (FIPS) signed the cooperation agreement; Lakehead President Moira McPherson visited Furtwangen in the summer of 2019.

Furtwangen University is constantly expanding its range of bilingual degrees in order to optimally prepare students for their entry into the job market and give them the best opportunities. In addition to the subject content, students also acquire the European language level “C1” - by attending lectures in both languages, doing internships and semesters abroad or writing theses in the foreign language.

== Rankings ==
Furtwangen University consistently performs well in the university rankings of the Centrum für Hochschulentwicklung CHE and has been one of the top universities in Germany for many years. The degree programmes in Computer Science, Business, Business Information Systems, Business Administration and Engineering and Digital Media have received awards in the university rankings of CHE, Manager Magazin and Wirtschaftswoche.

Furtwangen University is the only university of applied sciences in Germany to be voted one of the TOP 15 German universities for international students by the Edarabia.com platform in 2021. HFU is listed in sixth place and praised for its combination of practical application and innovation as well as the outstanding quality of its degree programmes.
