= Museum of Clockmaking =

Museum in Germany

Coordinates: 48°03′52″N 8°31′50″E

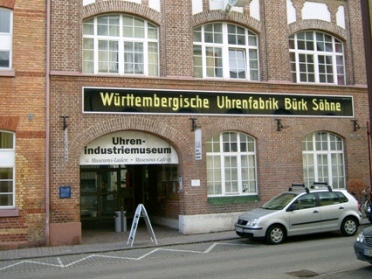
The Museum of Clockmaking at Bürkstraße 39.

Museum of Clockmaking, Villingen-Schwenningen, Baden-Württemberg

The Museum of Clockmaking (German: Uhrenindustriemuseum) is a museum in the town of Villingen-Schwenningen, Germany, and is dedicated to the history of the clockmaking industry in the town. For much of the 19th century (and early 20th century), Schwenningen was one of southern Germany's most important centres of industrial scale clock manufacturing.

The museum is at Bürkstraße 39, a building that was built to house the manufacturing plant for clocks by Wũrttenbergische Uhrenfabrik Bũrk Söhne. That company was considered to be the world leader in the specialised field of portable watchmen's control clocks and related time-recording devices.

The core of the museum's collection is made up of working production machinery used to make precision metal parts that can be assembled into clock movements. They have all the machinery in-house to produce all components (except for the mainspring) to manufacture a simple alarm clock movement. Staffing permitting, the full museum visit includes a demonstration of the lathes, milling machines and punch presses, as well as the assembly and packaging process.

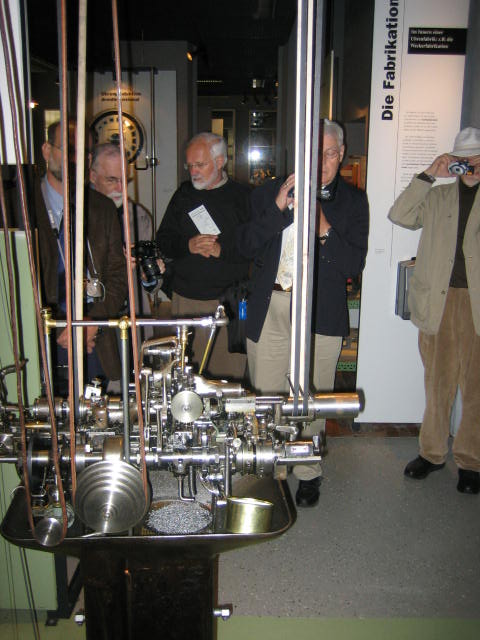
Automated screw machines making precision components from brass for clock movements at museums

In addition, there is a comprehensive display of locally mass-produced clocks from most of the former clock factories of Schwenningen. The museum also puts on temporary exhibitions.

== See also ==
- Horology
- German Clock Museum
- Mussee Internationale d'Horlogerie
- National Watch and Clock Museum
