= Black Forest Clock Association =

Syndicate set up in 1987

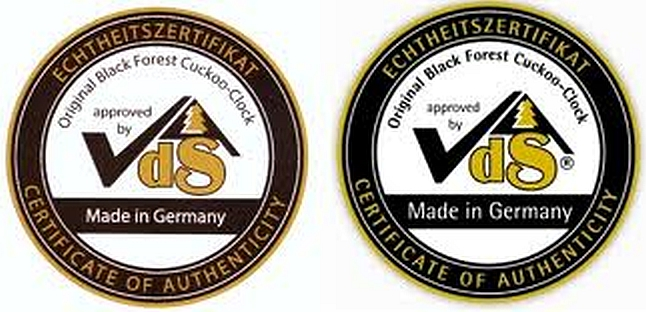
Left, early (1987-2006) & right, modern (post 2006) VDS seals on clocks originating from a manufacturer in the Black Forest Region registered with the syndicate. (Designed by artist Benno Gasche from Schonach).

The Black Forest Clock Association (German: Verein die Schwarzwalduhr – VdS) is a syndicate that was set up in 1987 to protect traditional mechanical cuckoo clock making in the Black Forest region in Baden-Württemberg (Germany).

The association issues authenticity certification (echtheitszertifikat) to members of the association. Verein die Schwarzwalduhr literally means "The Black Forest Clock Association". If a Black Forest clockmaker desires, they can obtain accreditation from the syndicate.

Certification from the association is awarded only to mechanical clocks made entirely of wood (except the movements), with all essential parts produced in the Black Forest and that meet quality controls set by the association.

The members of the association represent around 90% of all producers of Black Forest Clocks, the majority of the world's mechanical cuckoo clock manufacture. Clocks made by a company registered with the association are entitled to display the seal on their products.

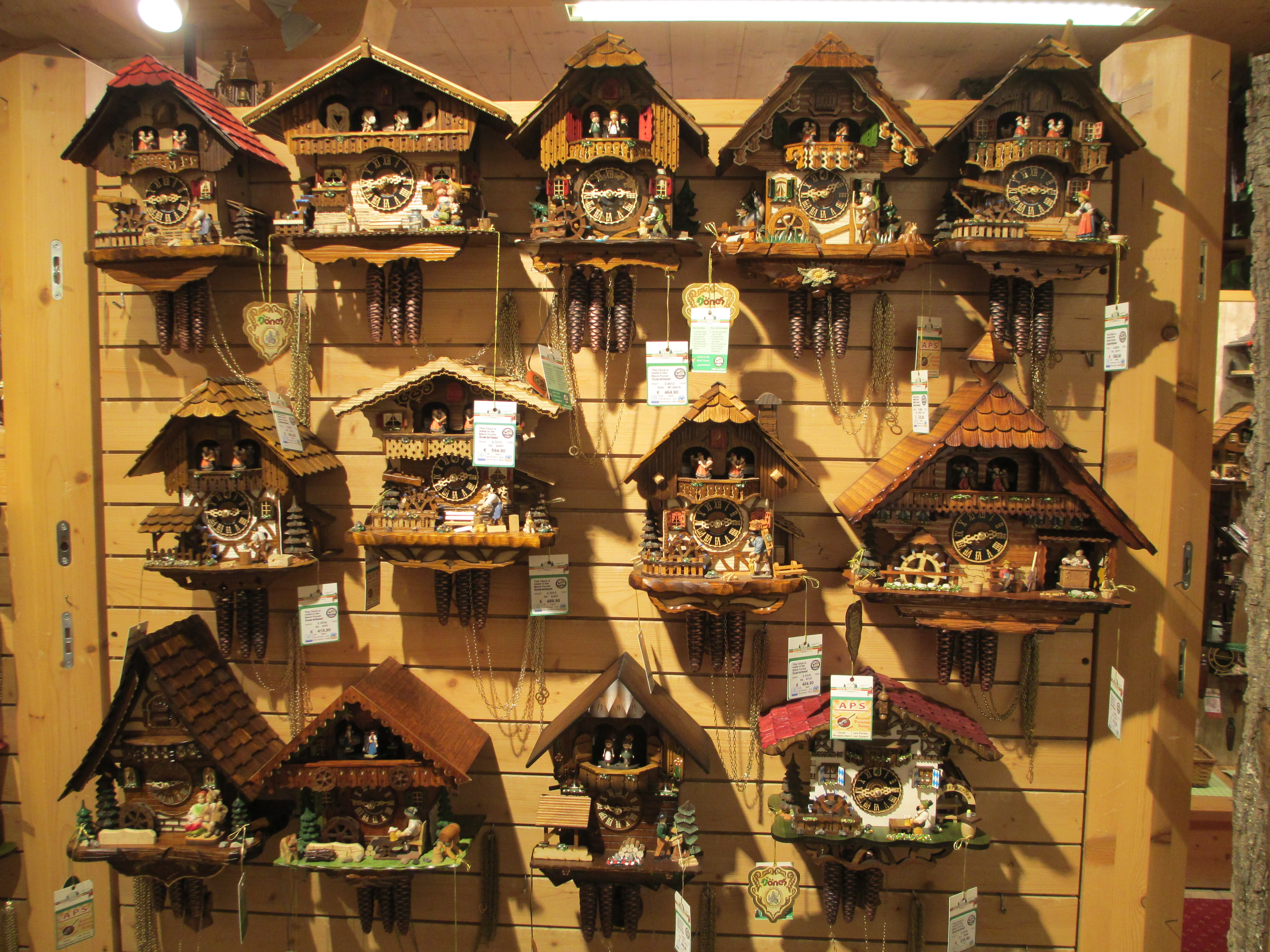
Mechanical Black Forest cuckoo clocks in the chalet style in a shop in Triberg.

In 2006, the association's seal was awarded a protection of trade mark by the German trade mark office and can therefore bear the ® symbol. The VdS claims that over 300,000 clocks with the seal have been sold in the last few years, the majority of which to customers in North America. This acts as a useful way to date a clock bearing the seal, as any seal with the ® symbol must be post 2006.

Some German cuckoo clock manufacturers registered with VdS certification also produce battery powered quartz movement cuckoo clocks. These clocks are less expensive and require less servicing for the end user. However, quartz or solar movement clocks made by these same manufacturers cannot bear the VdS seal even though their mechanical movement models do display the seal.

In 2001, the VdS launched the competition Schwarzwalduhr des Jahres ("Black Forest Clock of the Year"). Since 2017, in cooperation with Schwarzwald Tourismus GmbH. Every year, is awarded to one of the members of the association. (See: Black Forest Clock of the Year - Complete Winner List (until 2014)) Since 2021, people can also vote online for its favourite clock on the Schwarzwald Tourismus site.

It is not to be confused with the Black Forest Association (Schwarzwaldverein) which is a hiking association.

== Winners of the Schwarzwalduhr des Jahres ("Black Forest Clock of the Year") ==
In alphabetical order:

- Anton Schneider: 2007, 2014
- August Schwer: 2004, 2008, 2009, 2010, 2012, 2016, 2017, 2022
- Hekas: 2020
- Hönes: 2006, 2019, 2023, 2024, 2025, 2026
- Hubert Herr (defunct in 2020, the trademark was taken over by Hekas): 2011, 2013
- Rombach und Haas: 2001, 2002, 2003, 2005, 2021

== Black Forest manufacturers ==
Cuckoo clock makers members of the VdS:

- Anton Schneider
- August Schwer
- Engstler
- Hekas
- Hönes
- Robert Herr
- Rombach und Haas

== See also ==
- Cuckoo clock in culture
- List of largest cuckoo clocks
