= James J. Fiorentino Museum =

Museum in Minneapolis, Minnesota

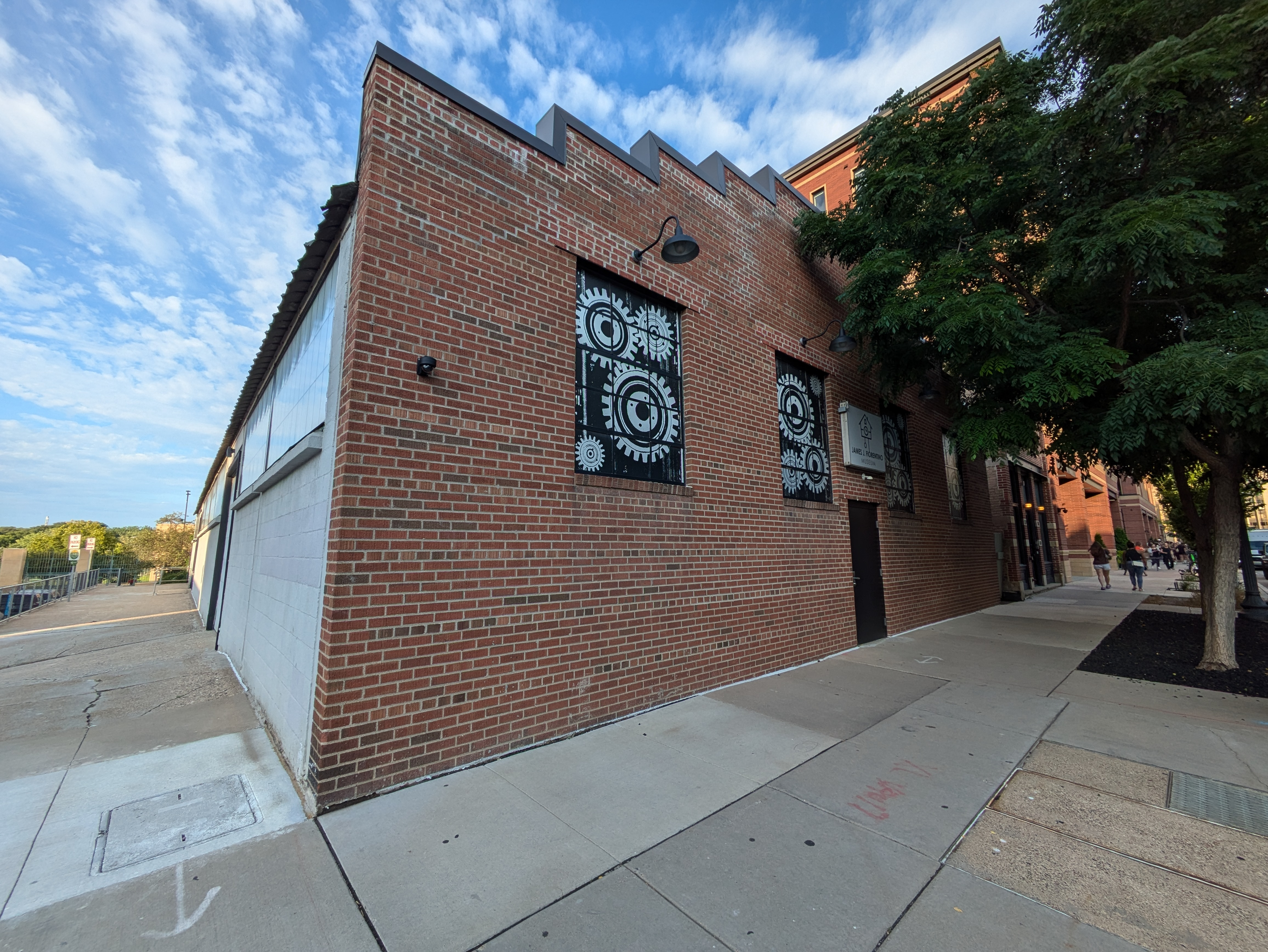
- Established: 2021
- Location: 126 N 1st Street, Minneapolis, Minnesota
- Coordinates: 44°59′7.5″N 93°16′7″W
- Type: History
- Website: https://www.clocksandstuff.org

The James J. Fiorentino Museum, also known as the James Fiorentino Cuckoo Clock Museum, is a museum in Minneapolis that houses a large, private collection of cuckoo clocks.

== History ==
The museum was founded by James Fiorentino, an inventor and owner of a garage door business, which became the building the museum now operates out of. Fiorentino, who died in 2017, wanted his collection of clocks and other antiques to be displayed in a free museum.

Fiorentino lacked interest in the historical origins of the clocks. Not having ever traveled to Germany, he acquired all the clocks within a 200-mile radius from estate sales, auctions, and a Salvation Army around Minnesota. Fiorentino was more captivated by the beauty of the woodworking on the cuckoo clocks and old phonographs rather than their sound.

The museum opened its doors to the public in fall 2021. It is located in the North Loop neighborhood of Minneapolis in a former industrial warehouse.

== Collections ==
The museum is home to hundreds of cuckoo clocks, as well as other items such as phonographs and vintage musical instruments and geologic specimens. The cuckoo clocks in the museum come from all over the world and range in age from a few decades old to over a century. Fiorentino's collection of cuckoo clocks began in the 1970s, now showcasing over 300 of them in his museum. Primarily from the 19th century, with a few dating back to the 1820s, most clocks are traditional Black Forest cuckoos: dark-stained linden wood, native to a particular area east of the Rhine in Germany.

Over a hundred of the clocks are working and the staff is working to restore more.

== See also ==
- List of museums in Minnesota
