= Reginald Digby =

English cricketer

Personal information
- Born: 30 April 1847; Tittleshall, Norfolk, England
- Died: 29 September 1927 (aged 80); Colehill, Dorset, England
- Batting: Right-handed
- Relatives: Caroline Grace Boddington (wife); Ethel Margaret Digby (daughter); Edith Digby (daughter); Mabel Digby (daughter); Reverend Lionel Kenelm Digby (son); Kenelm Digby (brother); Cyril Buxton (nephew); Arthur Watson (nephew); Hubert Watson (nephew)

Domestic team information
- Years: Team
- 1867–1869: Oxford University

Career statistics
Competition	First-class
Matches	14
Runs scored	429
Batting average	18.65
100s/50s	–/1
Top score	88
Catches/stumpings	3/–
- Source: Cricinfo, 1 May 2020

Reginald Digby (30 April 1847 – 29 September 1927) was an English first-class cricketer.

The son of The Rev. Hon. Kenelm Henry Digby, he was born in April 1847 at Tittleshall, Norfolk. He was educated at Harrow School, before going up to Magdalen College, Oxford. While studying at Oxford, he played first-class cricket for Oxford University, making his debut against the Marylebone Cricket Club at Oxford in 1867. He played first-class cricket for Oxford until 1869, making fourteen appearances, which included three appearances on the losing in The University Matches of 1867, 1868 and 1869. Digby scored 429 runs in his fourteen matches, at an average of 18.65 and with a high score of 88. He was described by Wisden Cricketers' Almanack as “a sound batsman with a finished style and a good field at cover-point”.

After completing his bachelor's degree at Magdalen College, he proceeded to New College in 1870 to complete his master's degree. After graduating from Oxford, he was employed as a land agent for the Digby Estates in Ireland, where he was also a justice of the peace for Queen's County. He lived out his latter years in England at Colehill in Dorset, where he died in September 1927. He was married to Caroline Grace Boddington in 1872, with the couple having four children. His brother, Sir Kenelm Digby, was a first-class cricketer, lawyer and civil servant, while three of his nephews also played first-class cricket. His grandfather was Sir Henry Digby, a Royal Navy admiral.
