= Hubert Watson =

English cricketer and colonial administrator

Personal information
- Full name: Hubert Digby Watson
- Born: 31 December 1869; Harrow, Middlesex, England
- Died: 9 October 1947 (aged 77); Inkpen, Berkshire, England
- Batting: Right-handed
- Bowling: Right-arm underarm slow
- Relatives: Arthur Watson (brother); Reginald Digby (uncle); Kenelm Digby (uncle)

Domestic team information
- Years: Team
- 1891–1892: Oxford University

Career statistics
| Competition | First-class |
|---|---|
| Matches | 10 |
| Runs scored | 248 |
| Batting average | 13.05 |
| 100s/50s | –/– |
| Top score | 40 |
| Catches/stumpings | 6/– |
- Source: Cricinfo, 2 July 2020

Hubert Digby Watson CIE CBE (31 December 1869 – 9 October 1947) was an English first-class cricketer and colonial administrator.

The son of Arthur George Watson, he was born at Harrow in December 1869. He was educated at Harrow School, before going up to Balliol College, Oxford. While studying at Oxford, he made ten appearances in first-class cricket for Oxford University in 1891–92. He scored 248 runs in his ten matches, at an average of 13.05 and with a high score of 40.

After graduating from Oxford, Watson joined the Indian Civil Service in December 1893, where he was posted to the Punjab as an assistant commissioner. He was a political officer at Wanna in 1898, before being transferred to the North-West Frontier Province in 1901, with Watson serving there as a deputy commissioner by 1904. At this post he compiled and edited the imperial gazatteer on the Hazara District in what is now northern Pakistan.

He was made a Companion to the Order of the Indian Empire in the 1919 New Year Honours. Watson later served as a treasurer for Save the Children and was appointed a Commander of the Order of the British Empire in the 1932 New Year Honours. Watson died in October 1947 at Inkpen, Berkshire. His brother, Arthur, and uncles, Reginald and Kenelm, all played first-class cricket.
