= Beha (surname) =

Beha is a surname. Notable people with the surname include:

- Ann Beha (born 1950), American architect
- Christopher Beha, American writer
- Johann Baptist Beha (1815–1898), German clockmaker
- Lorenz Beha, (c.1825–1853), German watchmaker and silversmith
- Oliviero Beha, (1949–2017), Italian journalist, writer, essayist, TV, and radio host
- Philippe Béha, (born 1950), French Canadian children's book writer and illustrator
