= Johann Baptist Beha =

German clockmaker (1815–1898)

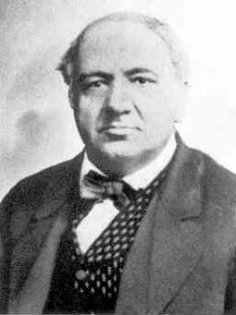
- Born: 1815; Oberbränd (Eisenbach), Germany
- Died: 1898 (aged 82–83)
- Occupations: Horologist, Inventor
- Notable work: Spring wound cuckoo clocks
- Children: 11, (five with his first wife and 6 with the second one)
- Parent(s): Vinzenz Beha and ?

Johann Baptist Beha (1815 - 1898) was a prestigious Black Forest clockmaker born in Oberbränd (Eisenbach). He was trained by his father, the master clockmaker Vinzenz Beha (1764-1868), in his workshop where he built around 365 clocks between 1839 and 1845. At that time V. Beha was already known for the quality of his clocks, he made the so-called Shield cuckoo clocks.

In 1845 Johann B. Beha founded his own clockshop in Eisenbach, beginning the manufacturing of his celebrated clocks.

== Contributions to the construction of cuckoo clocks ==
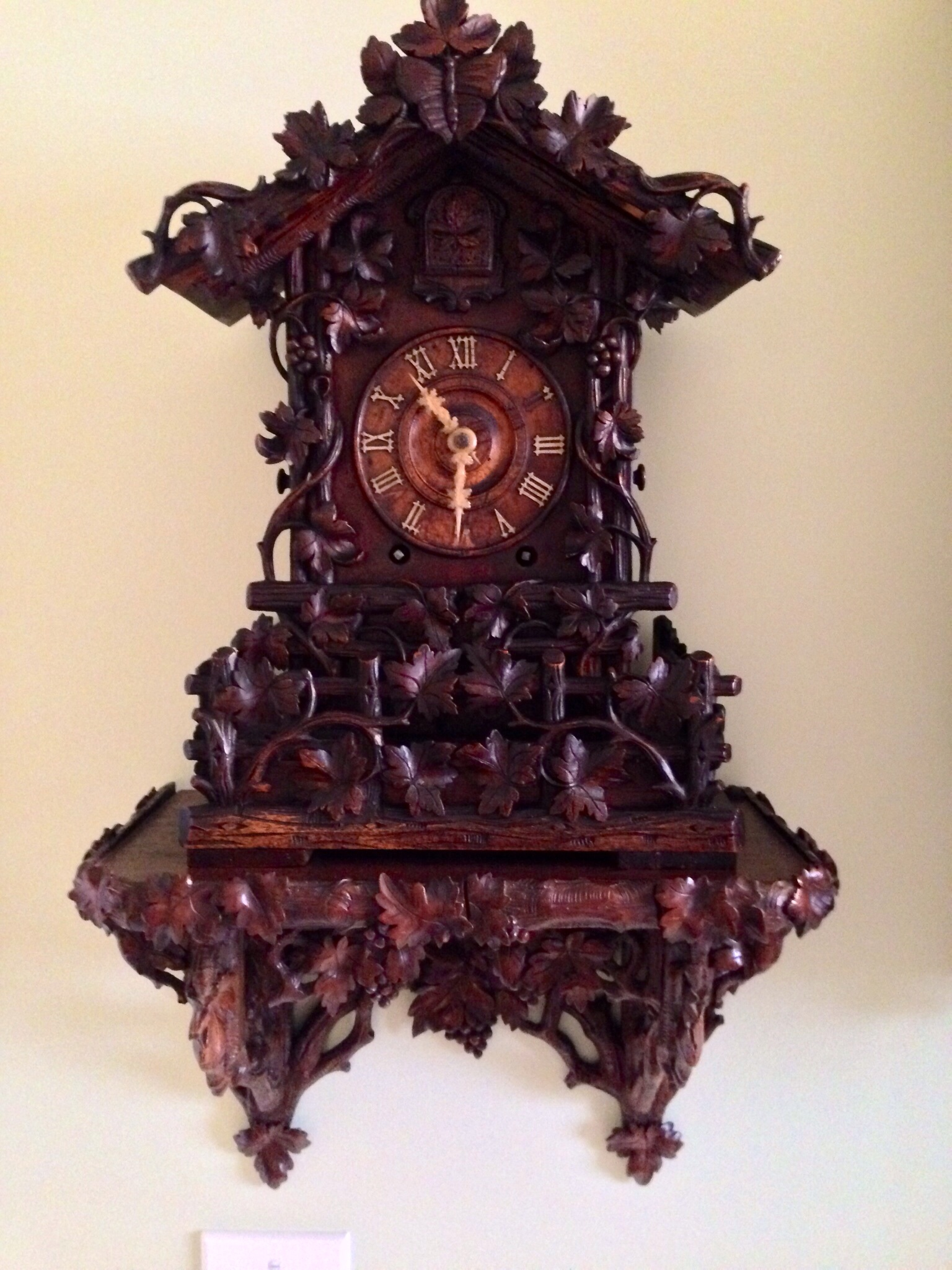
Model 509 with matching shelf.

The clockmaker introduced the following innovations into the construction of cuckoo clocks:

- He was the first to equip a Bahnhäusle style clock case with a cuckoo mechanism in 1854. A milestone in the Black Forest clock history, after this cuckoo clocks became popular and marketed worldwide. Indeed, although the Bahnhäusle style creator, Friedrich Eisenlohr, had proposed a cuckoo clock in his 1850 original design, however it was not until 1854 when J. B. Beha became the first clockmaker who take it from drawing to reality.
- He was also the first to make Black Forest wall and shelf cuckoo clocks with spring-wound movements. Between 1845 and 1850 the first 8-day cuckoos with fusee movements were built. At that time, without exception, the clocks had wooden plate movements. By adopting the English fusee system in his clocks he expanded the export market of cuckoo clocks to the U.K. The main importers of his clocks were Camerer, Kuss & Co., London; Morath Brothers, Liverpool; and Bohringer, Belfast. Camerer Kuss was also the main exporter of Beha clocks to India.
- About 1850 Beha made the first oil painted picture frame cuckoo clocks, where the cuckoo was not integrated in the picture. Also about that time, the first cuckoo clocks with moving eyes came into use.
- The first one who made cuckoo clocks fitted with musical movements.

The cases for Beha clocks came from case/woodcarvers shops located in different towns of the Black Forest such as Waldkirch, Furtwangen, Villingen, Vöhrenbach and Dittishausen.

When signed, the Beha clocks bore two types of identifications; either a stick-on label which would be on the case back-board on the inside of the case or the name "Beha" engraved on one of the two brass fuseé drum ends. However, it is necessary to emphasize that most of the Beha timepieces were not signed and it is almost impossible to identify a Beha based on the case alone. The case makers that supplied Beha with their cases, sold identical cases to other manufacturers too. So today we can find identical cases, but in fact they were not made by the Beha enterprise. For example, Aaron Ketterer and Theodor Ketterer frequently used the Beha designed and their cases are nearly identical. That is why the mechanism is the crucial part to give a positive attribution.

After the Philadelphia Centennial Exhibition of 1876, Johann B. Beha took his two sons, Lorenz and Engelbert, into his firm as partners and the company was refounded as "Johann Baptist Beha und Söhne".

While the big factories - Junghans, Kienzle, Philipp Haas und Söhne and Werner, and the smaller firms like Dold, Hilser, Gordian Hettich Sohn, Rombach and Maier- developed their cuckoo clock production in response to the growing demand of the new middle-class for a cheaper clock, especially cheaper carvings, the Behas followed a contrary strategy. They did not believe in the success of the mass-produced cuckoo clock. A similar strategy was followed by other Black Forest clock manufacturers such as Emilian Wehrle, Winterhalder & Hofmeier, Maurer und Höfler, etc.

When Johann Baptist Beha died in 1898, his sons Lorenz (1865 - 1941) and Engelbert (1866 - 1949) continued with the company in Eisenbach. The manufacturing program consisted of; cuckoo/quail clocks, cuckoo clocks with echo, weight operated clocks, spring powered clocks, trumpeter clocks, monk ringing a monastery bell, calendar clocks, etc.

The largest export market of Beha clocks was to the United Kingdom and Russia. In Saint Petersburg Beha even operated their own warehouse, from there the clocks were marketed to different countries, but with the outbreak of World War I, the St. Petersburg warehouse was closed. The Beha enterprise struggled during the 1920s to recover the lost export market facing extremely difficult economic times and during the 1930s, with the onset of the economic dictatorship of the "Hitler Regime" in the year 1933, the use of brass and copper was strictly rationed, although the production continued on a very limited scale until 1938. But finally after the World War II the production was stopped forever in 1956.

== Awards and recognitions ==
The company won several awards as well as gold and silver medals for the quality in workmanship and design in different countries, like the Gold Medal of the Vienna World Trade Exhibition of 1873. He was the only Black Forest cuckoo clock maker who was honored in such a way. Former honors at the International exhibition in London 1862, and Paris 1867 and at regional exhibitions in Villingen 1858 and Karlsruhe 1861, had also testified to the excellent quality of the cuckoo clocks of Johann B. Beha. For the clocks shown in Philadelphia in 1876, the firm was honored with the meritory medal by the United States Centennial Commission. Further honors followed at the exhibitions in Karlsruhe 1877, London 1885, Freiburg 1877, Chicago 1893 and Strasbourg 1895.

Johann Baptist Beha represented the typical Black Forest clockmaker of the 18th and 19th century: experimenting, inventing, self-educated, always seeking solutions with limited theoretical knowledge, creating technical miracles beyond any comparison today.

== Beha clocks as collector pieces ==
The clocks made by the Beha company are sought-after collector pieces and are part of both private collections and the most reputed museums in the world such as the British Museum, the Irish Museum of Time and the Deutsches Uhrenmuseum. Beha clocks are offered in auctions and by antique clocks traders.

== Trivia ==
Beha was almost certainly either a brother or cousin of Lorenz Beha a German watchmaker murdered in England in 1853.

== Bibliography ==
- Kochmann, Karl (2005): Black Forest Clockmaker and the Cuckoo Clock;
- Schneider, Wilhelm (1987): Frühe Kuckucksuhren von Johann Baptist Beha in Eisenbach im Hochschwarzwald, in: Uhren, Heft 3, 1987, S. 45 - 53;
- Schneider, Wilhelm (1988): The cuckoo clocks of Johann Baptist Beha, in: Antiquarian Horology, Vol. 17, 1988, p. 455 - 462;
- Wilhelm und Monika Schneider (1988), Black Forest Cuckoo Clocks at the Exhibitions in Philadelphia 1876 and Chicago 1893, in: NAWCC, Vol. 30/2, No. 253, 1988, S. 116 – 127, 128 -132.
- Schneider, Wilhelm, Frühe Kuckucksuhren, Entwicklungsgeschichte der Schwarzwälder Kuckucksuhr von 1750 - 1850, Regensburg 2008.
- Miller, Justin (2012), Rare and Unusual Black Forest Clocks, Schiffer 2012, p. 27-103.

== See also ==
- Irish Museum of Time
- Emilian Wehrle
- Theodor Ketterer
