= Black Forest clockmakers =

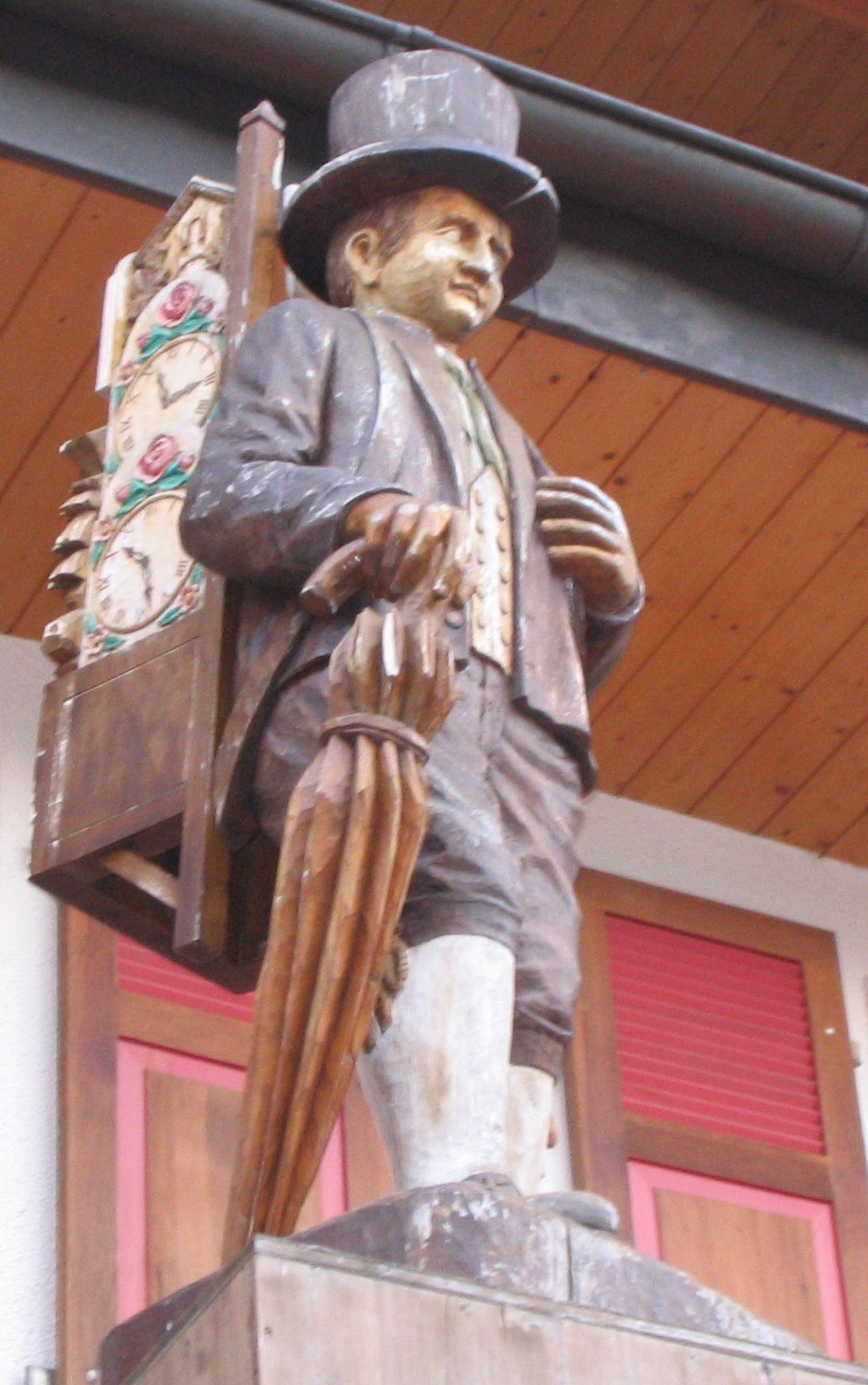
Black Forest clock porter

Craftsmanship of Black Forest clockmakers dates back to mid of the 17th century. A specialized branch of Black Forest clockmakers are the manufacturers of cuckoo clocks.

== History ==
=== Beginnings in the 17th century ===
Black Forest clock production began in the mid-17th century. The first range of clocks were for practical use and of simple design. The popularity of clocks from Black Forest grew, and plates and clock faces became more sophisticated. It is said that, in the early days, Black Forest clocks were copied from the Bohemian style. Gradually Black Forest clocks gained in reputation; especially the famous cuckoo clocks, which developed into their now typical style from around 1854.

=== Shop assembly ===
In the first half of the 18th century, wooden wheels were used in Black Forest clock manufacturing (German: Holzräderuhr). In the second half of the 18th century, technical progress led to winding wheels being produced in yellow brass. Towards the end of the 18th century, plate clocks for the wall were produced. They had wooden panels which were painted in lacquer (Lack-Schilderuhr). At the end of the 18th century, Jacob Herbstreith manufactured small wall clocks with plates in porcelain or brass (Jockele-Uhr). At the beginning of the 19th century, the Sorgs, a clockmaker family, produced a very small wall clock (Sorg-Uhr).

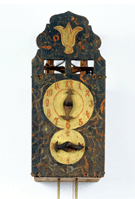
Clock with wooden cogs

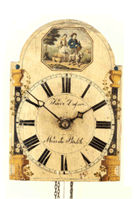
A wooden plate clock (Lackschild-Uhr )

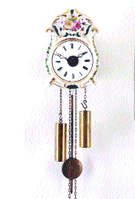
A porcelain plate clock (Jockele-Uhr)

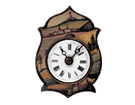
A very small Sorg Clock (Sorg-Uhr)

=== Industrial production ===
The heart of Black forest clock production was an area that extended from Triberg via Furtwangen to St. Peter. In 1850, the Duchy of Baden founded the first school for clockmakers in Furtwangen in order to improve the standard of production and make it more efficient. Several times of crisis followed. In the mid-19th century, mass production began. But after the American Civil War, elements of the US war industry switched to highly competitive clock production. German clock manufacturers thus lost market share.

Special types of clock were developed: the cuckoo clock, the figurine clock, clocks that chimed the hours, the bracket clock and the grandfather clock.

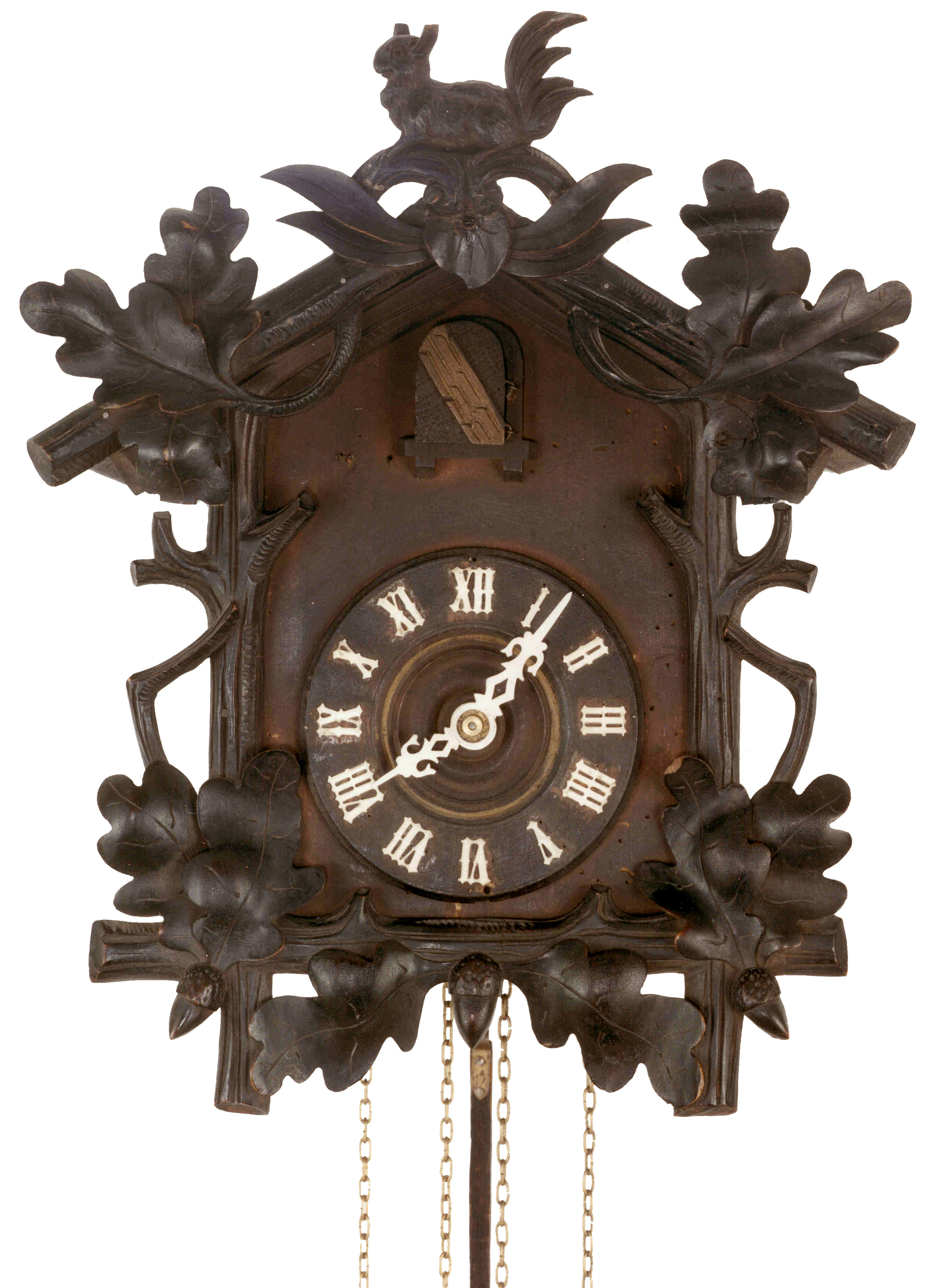
A cuckoo clock (Kuckucksuhr)

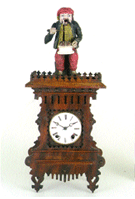
A figurine clock (Figurenuhr)

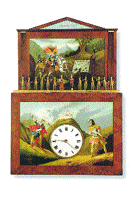
A flute clock (Flötenuhr)

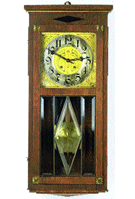
A grandfather clock (Regulator)

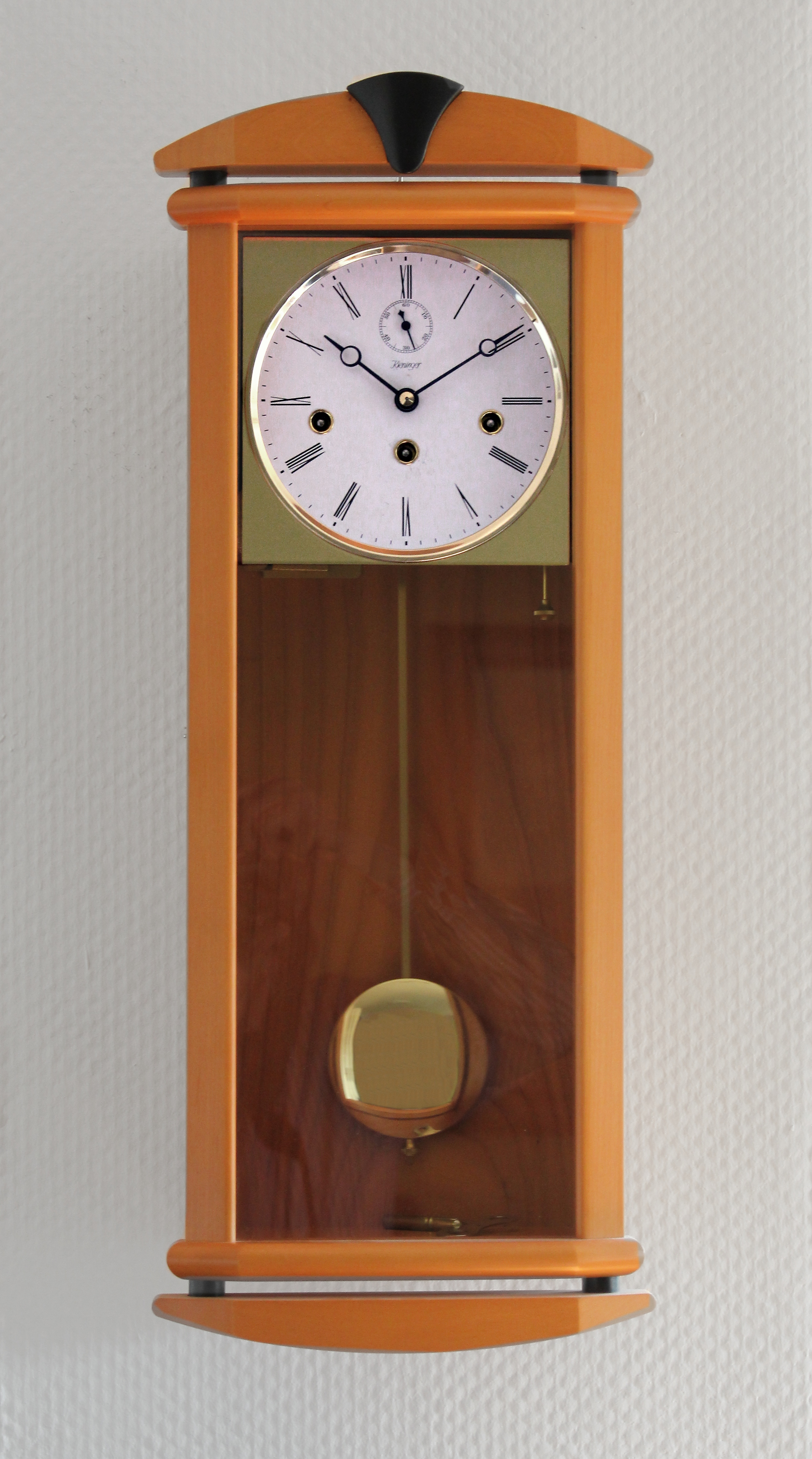
Regulator from 1999/2000

=== Boom and decline ===
At the beginning of the 20th century, the clock industry initially prospered but then collapsed as the First World War broke out and, subsequently, the Russian and American markets broke away. After the Second World War, exports boosted production.

=== Continuing structural change ===
In the 1970s, the advent of new plastic clock cases and quartz clockworks lead to serious restructuring. The new methods meant many workers became redundant and brought higher competition from the newly industrialized countries. Also, the introduction of LCD watches led to further painful restructuring. The number of employed clockworkers shrunk from 28,000 in 1973 to 21,000 in 1976. The export-oriented German clock industry had to weather a roller-coaster of unstable exchange rates, lower growth rates, high competition from developing countries and continual technological change.“ Continuing new techniques and globalization affect the Black Forest clock industry.

== Black Forest clockmakers ==
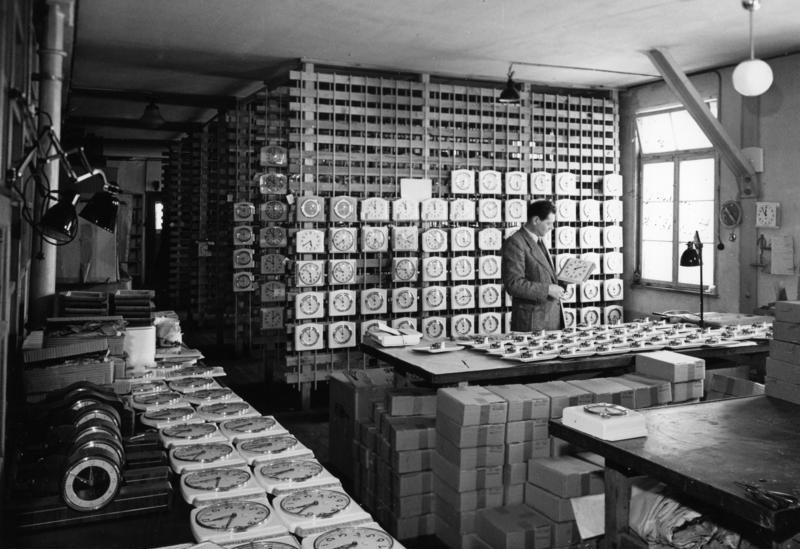
Badische Uhrenfabrik AG, final control (1954)

The German Clock Museum (German: Deutsches Uhrenmuseum) also has in its collection some early Black Forest clocks with wooden cogwheels as well as a number of industrially produced Black Forest clocks. The German Clock Route (in German: Deutsche Uhrenstraße) is a themed route that connects places with relevant museums and (former) clock manufacturers in the Black Forest.

=== Former clockmakers ===
- Aktiengesellschaft für Uhrenfabrikation Lenzkirch
- Badische Uhrenfabrik Furtwangen AG
- Johann Baptist Beha (1815–1898)
- Theodor Ketterer (1815–1884)
- Mauthe
- Uhrenfabrik Villingen AG
- Emilian Wehrle (1832–1896)
- Winterhalder & Hofmeier (clocks)
- Württembergische Uhrenfabrik Bürk
- Schemekenbecher Uhrenfabrik 1948-1996 Villingen AG

=== Active clockmakers ===
- Hekas
- Hermle
- Hubert Herr
- Rombach & Haas
- Robert Herr
- SS technic (Regula)
- August Schwer
- Adolf Herr

== Black Forest clocks on the antique market ==
Bracket clocks and grandfather clocks by Black forest clockmakers are viewed on the German and American antique market as mechanical clocks of high craftsmenship.

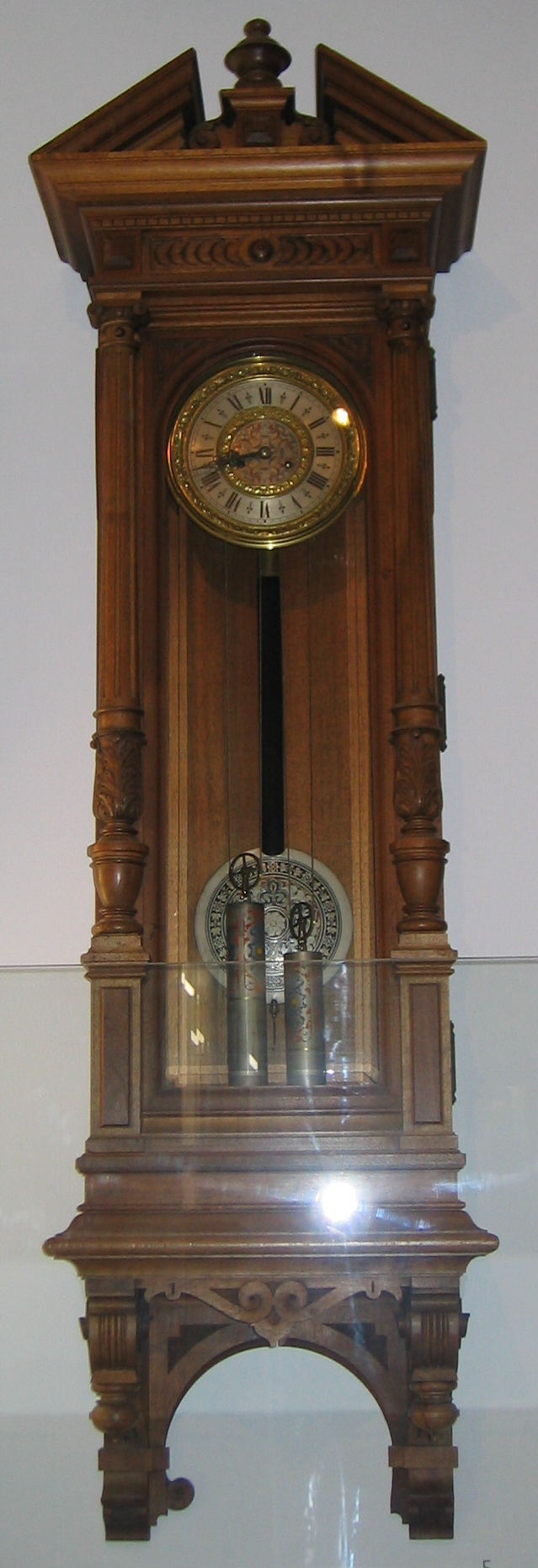
Grandfather clock from 1890 manufactured by AG Lenzkirch

== Literature ==
- Rick Ortenburger: Black Forest Clocks. Schiffer Publications, Ltd, Atglen, Pennsylvania, USA, 1991. ISBN 0-88740-300-X.
- (de) Helmut Kahlert:300 Jahre Schwarzwälder Uhrenindustrie, Katz, 2007, ISBN 978-3-938047-15-6. (In English: 300 years of the Black Forest Clock Industry)
- (de) Herbert Jüttemann: Die Schwarzwalduhr. Badenia-Verlag, Karlsruhe, 2000, ISBN 978-3-89735-360-2. (In English: The Black forest clock)
- (de) Ekkehard Liehl, Wolf Dieter Sick (eds.): Der Schwarzwald. Beiträge zur Landeskunde. Veröffentlichungen des Alemannischen Instituts, 47, Freiburg im Breisgau, 4th edn., 1989. (In English: Black Forest. Studies of Geography, History and Institutions)
- (de) Berthold Schaaf: Schwarzwalduhren. G. Braun Buchverlag, Karlsruhe, 4th edition, 2008. ISBN 978-3-7650-8391-4. (In English: Black Forest clocks).
- (de) Gerd Bender: Die Uhrmacher des hohen Schwarzwalds und ihre Werke. Vol. 1, 1998, and Vol., 2 1978. Verlag Müller, Villingen. (In English: The Clockmakers of the High Black Forest and their Works).
