= Carriage clock =

Spring-driven clock designed for travel

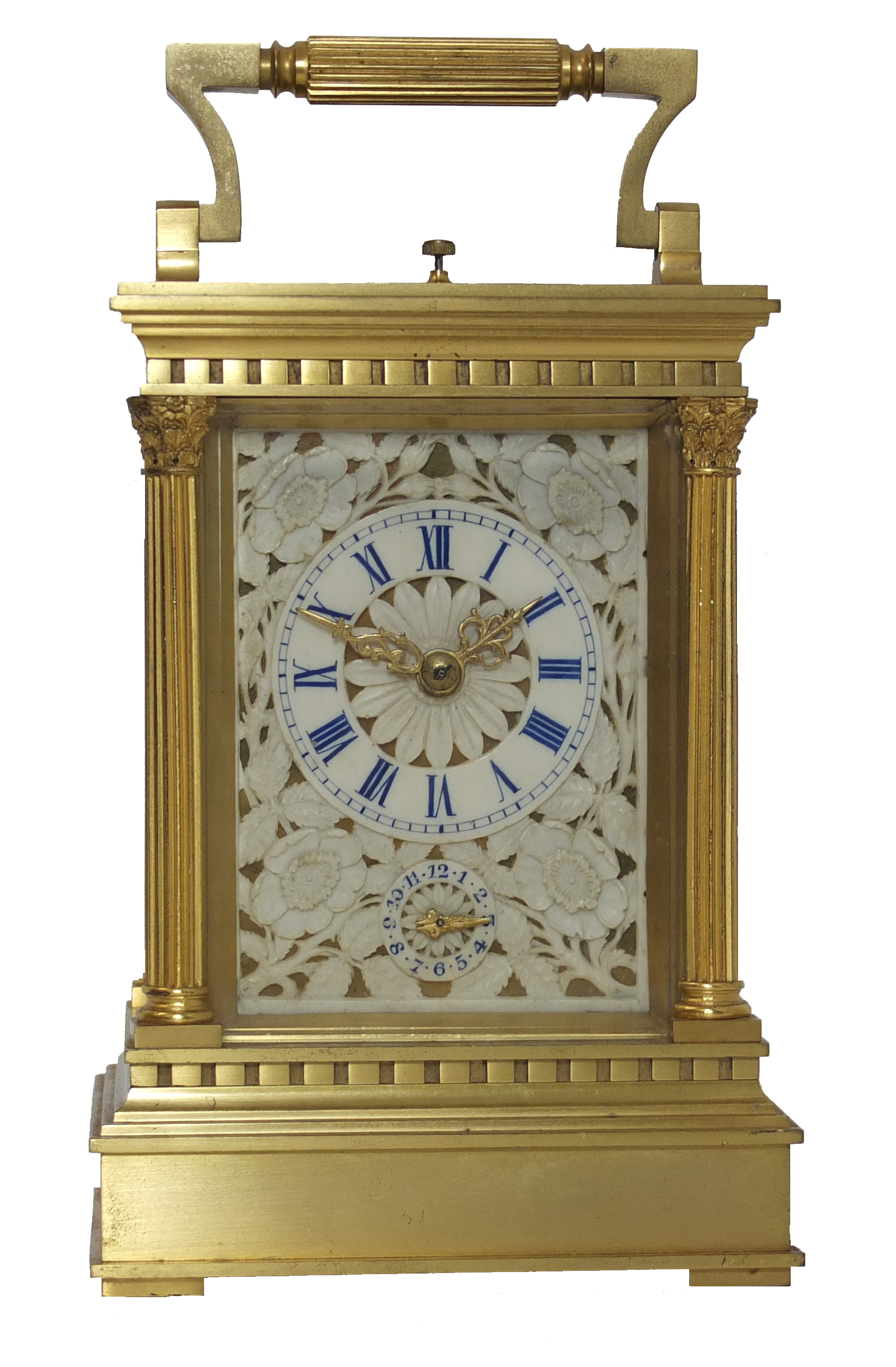
Carriage clock, Armand Couaillet

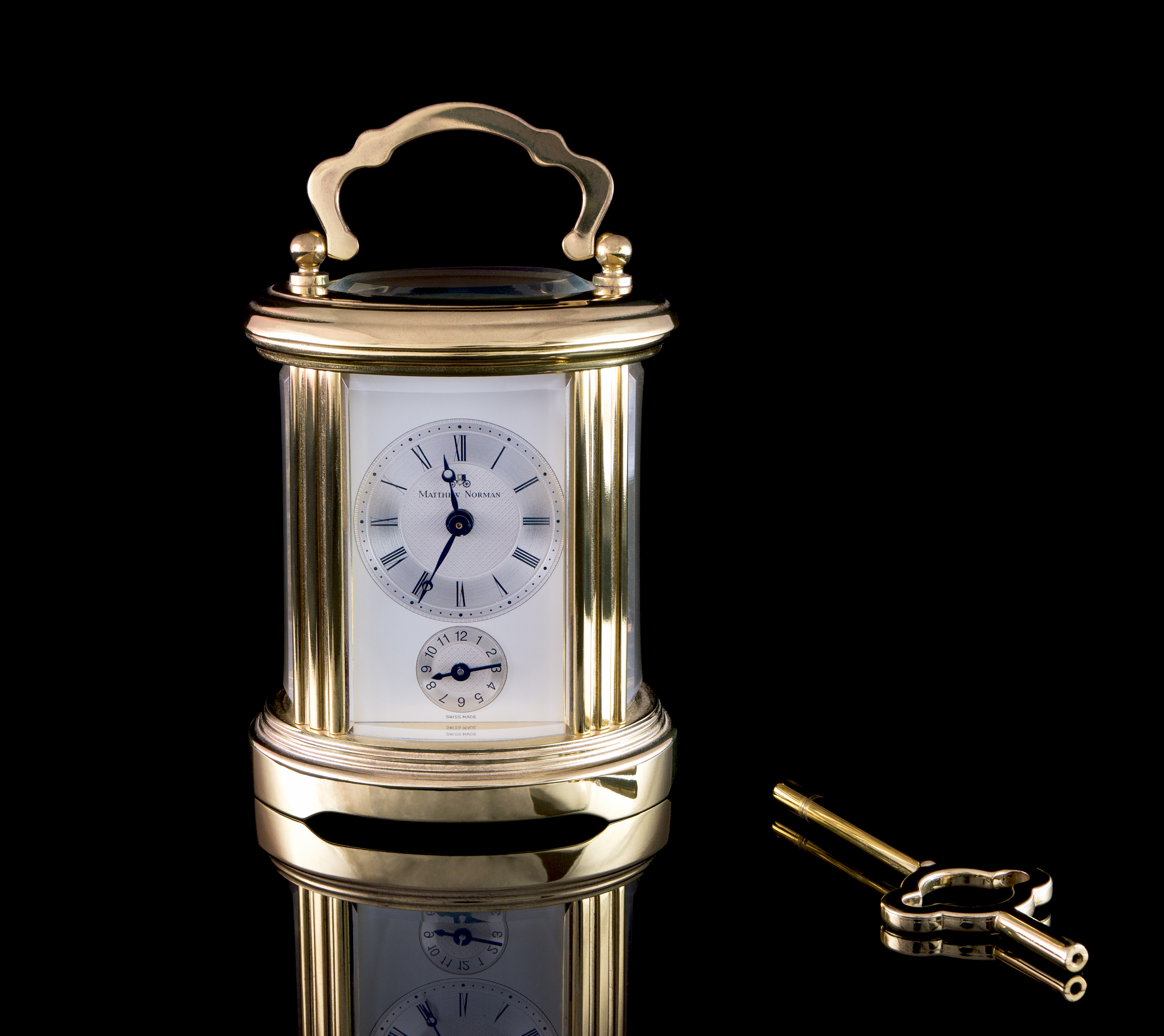
Matthew Norman carriage clock with winding key

A carriage clock is a small, spring-driven clock, designed for travelling, developed in the early 19th century in France. The first carriage clock was invented by Abraham-Louis Breguet for the Emperor Napoleon in 1812. The case, usually plain or gilt-brass, is rectangular with a carrying handle and often set with glass or more rarely enamel or porcelain panels. A feature of carriage clocks is the platform escapement, sometimes visible through a glazed aperture on the top of the case. Carriage clocks use a balance and balance spring for timekeeping and replaced the larger pendulum bracket clock. The factory of Armand Couaillet, in Saint-Nicolas d'Aliermont, France, made thousands of carriage clocks between 1880 and 1920.

A carriage clock has in the past been a traditional gift from employers to retiring or long-serving staff. However, in modern times, with changing work patterns and changing desires, this is much less the case.

== Sources and references ==
- Charles Allix and Peter Bonnert, Carriage Clocks: Their History and Development, Antique Collector's Club, 1974
- Emmanuelle Cournarie, La mécanique du geste, trois siècles d'histoire horlogère à Saint-Nicolas d'Aliermont, Éditions PTC-Les Falaises, 2011 (French)
- Lolita Delesque and Marianne Lombardi, Armand Couaillet, horloger et inventeur de génie, Musée de l'horlogerie, juin 2013, 44 pp (French)
