= Cartel clock =

Type of wall clock

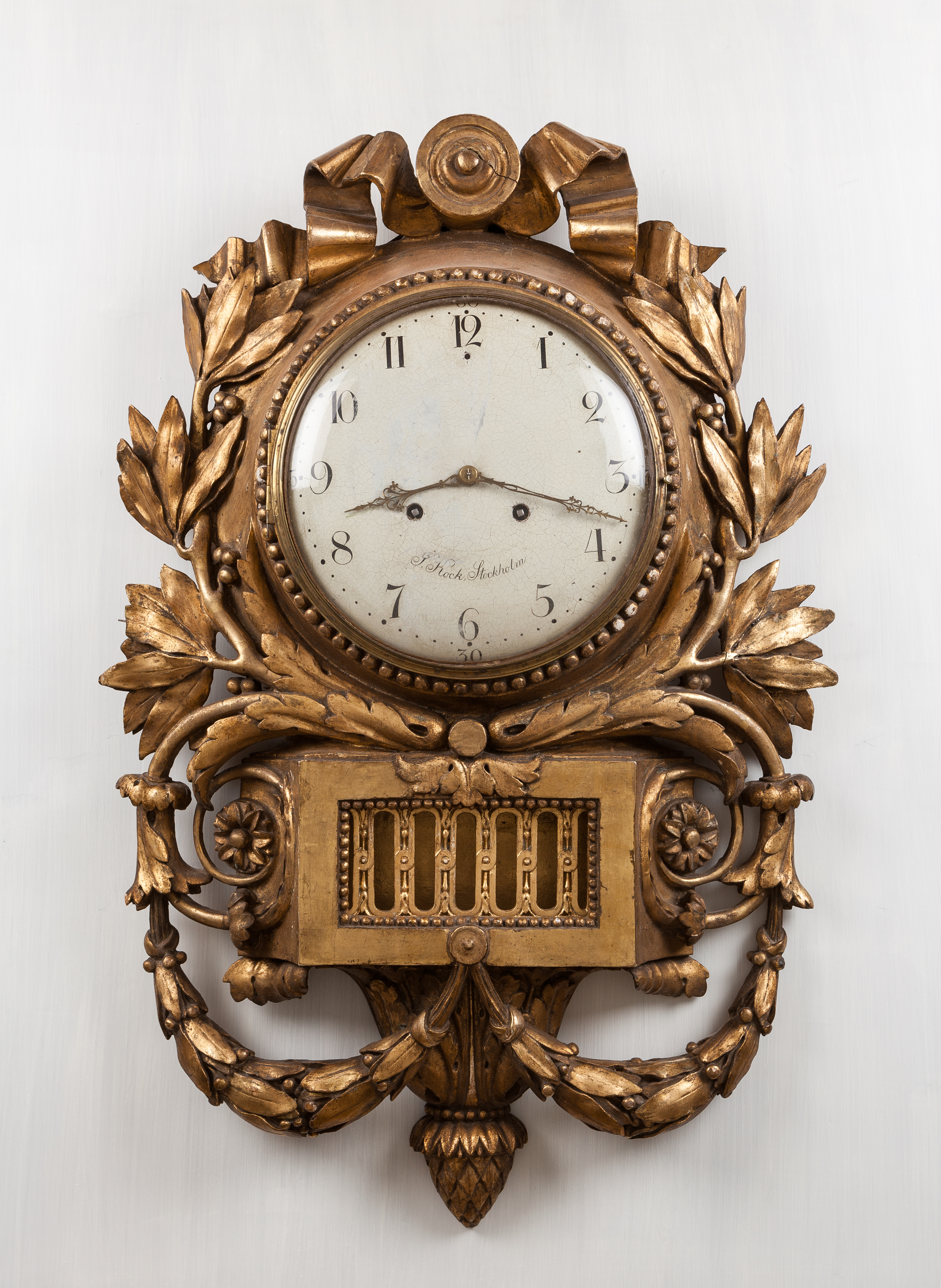
A late 18th-century Gustavian cartel clock by Jacob Kock, Stockholm

A cartel clock is a cartouche shaped clock designed to hang directly on a wall, very commonly executed in fire-gilt bronze (a.k.a. ormolu). The form is a more unified development from a wall-mounted bracket clock standing upon its separate, complementary bracket characteristic of the Régence (1715–23), which continued to be stylish in Paris through the 1740s. In Paris, where the ébéniste's wooden contribution to the case and wall bracket, conceived as complements in design, was by degrees overshadowed by gilt-bronze mounts. wholly gilt-bronze bracket clock cases became most common by ca 1730. The cartel clock, incorporating clock case and bracket in a single unified organic sculptural conception, was a Rococo invention initiated in Paris. Highly ornate Rococo examples exist, with flowing, asymmetrical and curvilinear designs, the most notable being a series of unified cartel clocks in half a dozen related models, dateable to the 1730s and 40s and attributed (some of them signed) to Charles Cressent.

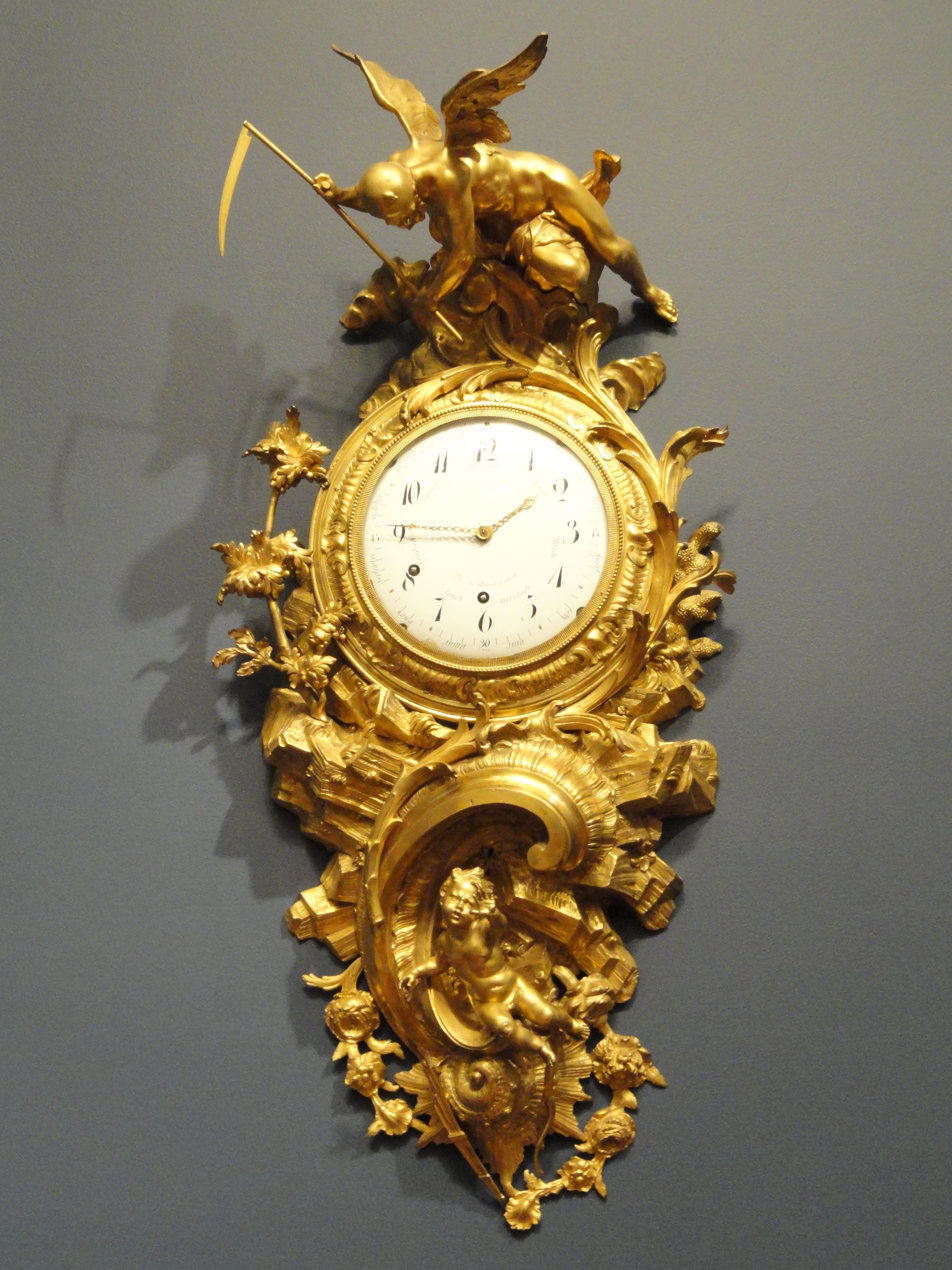
Cartel clock by Charles Cressent, 1745-50 (Nelson-Atkins Museum of Art)

The style that originated in Paris was used there from ca 1730 through the reign of Louis XV. With the return of classicism under Louis XVI, however, cartel clocks fell from favour in Paris, where the domestic clock moved to the mantel. In provincial French cities, and elsewhere on the Continent, cartel clocks were made in the neoclassical style (illustration, right) The style was adapted in Austria, Sweden and Switzerland, with the style used for clocks executed in wood and decorated with gold leaf. Such cartel clocks were made into the 19th century. With the "Second Rococo" beginning ca 1830, mid-18th century models were revived or imitated.
