= Emilian Wehrle =

German clockmaker

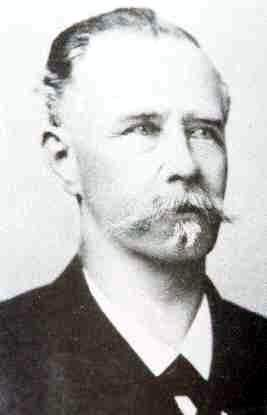
Emilian Wehrle

Emilian Wehrle (1832 – 1896, born in Schönenbach (Furtwangen), was a reputed Black Forest clockmaker famous for his high-quality musical clocks. These musical clocks included the trumpeter clock, flute clock, singing bird clock, and rooster clock. These timepieces call the hour with the sound of a trumpeter, flute, bird and rooster respectively. He was also a maker of cuckoo clocks, but these were not the primary focus of the firm.

Emilian came from a poverty-stricken farming area. His father, Konrad Wehrle (1796-1871), was a poor cottage clockmaker and farmer who, remarkably supported his family on less than a third of an acre of land. In spite of limited schooling, he proved he was an outstanding student of extreme achievements and technically very talented. With the money he saved by serving several years in the military he started his own clockmaking business in Furtwangen in 1857.

Emilian Wehrle never produced clocks in high numbers compared to other Black Forest makers. Instead he developed a niche selling his expensive musical clocks to people who could afford them.

In early 1866 Emilian formed a partnership with his next door neighbor Franz Xaver Wehrle (1819-1885), renaming the firm Emilian Wehrle & Co. Later that year on August 23, 1866, Emilian married F.X. Wehrle's daughter Norma Wehrle (1844-1901). Although both of the Wehrle families shared the same last name, there is no known blood relation between the two families until Emilain married Norma.

The Wehrle clocks were exported worldwide, primarily to the United States and Great Britain. These clocks of the period were not mass produced like the cuckoo clock which was a less expensive option. Today the Wehrle clocks are scarce and remain valuable to collectors.

After Emilian's death in 1896, Emilian Wehrle's brother-in-law, and then partner in the firm Julian Wehrle took control of the factory. Within a very short period of time the firm moved away from making musical clocks, and instead specialized in the fabrication of specialized parts for other industries. Today the firm is still in business and specializes in the production of water meters and other flow metering technology.

The Emilian Wehrle's clocks are sought-after museum pieces due to its high artistic, technical and musical level that went into each of his clocks.

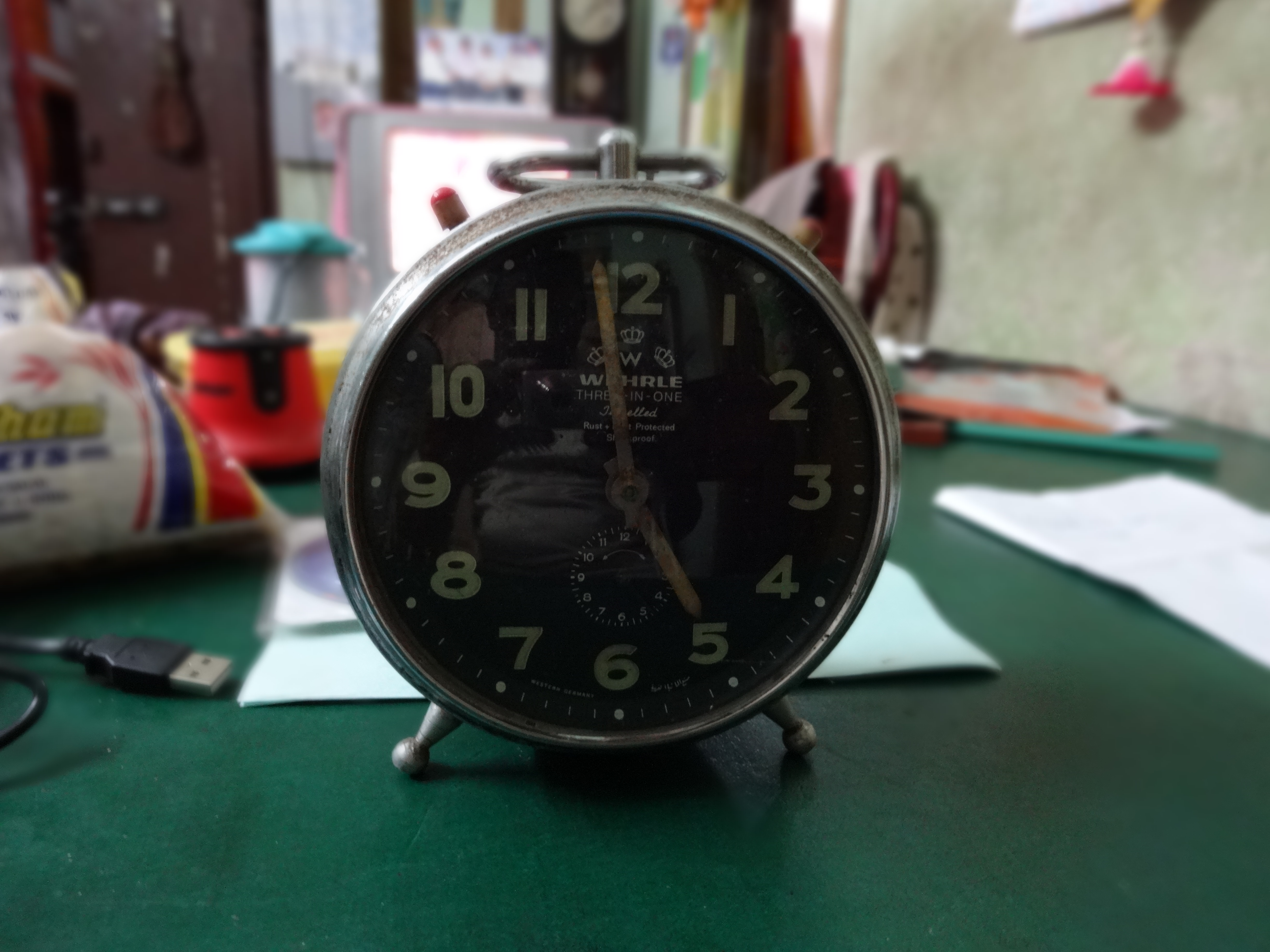
wherle alarmclock

== See also ==
- Johann Baptist Beha
- Theodor Ketterer
