= Cyril Buxton =

English cricketer

Personal information
- Full name: Cyril Digby Buxton
- Born: 25 June 1865; Woodford Wells, Essex, England
- Died: 10 May 1892 (aged 26); Woodford Wells, Essex, England
- Batting: Right-handed
- Bowling: Right-arm medium-pace
- Role: All-rounder
- Relatives: Reginald Digby (uncle); Kenelm Digby (uncle)

Domestic team information
- Years: Team
- 1885–88: Cambridge University
- 1889–91: Marylebone Cricket Club
- First-class debut: 18 May 1885 Cambridge University v C. I. Thornton's England XI
- Last First-class: 23 May 1891 Marylebone Cricket Club v Cambridge University

Career statistics
Competition	FC
Matches	40
Runs scored	1213
Batting average	18.95
100s/50s	1/3
Top score	108*
Balls bowled	3463
Wickets	60
Bowling average	25.36
5 wickets in innings	2
10 wickets in match	1
Best bowling	5/16
Catches/stumpings	30/–
- Source: CricketArchive, 19 April 2017

Cyril Digby Buxton (25 June 1865 – 10 May 1892) was an English cricketer and rackets player. He played 40 first-class matches for Cambridge University Cricket Club, the Marylebone Cricket Club (MCC), the Gentlemen and other amateur teams between 1885 and 1891.

Buxton and his family were involved in the Truman, Hanbury, Buxton & Co brewing company, and Buxton himself served as one of its directors. Suffering from a liver disease and depression in the early 1890s, Buxton committed suicide by firearm in 1892 while staying at his father's estate in Essex. His nurse discovered his dead body.

== Career ==
Buxton was the son of Edward North Buxton, the conservationist and some time Member of Parliament for Walthamstow. He was educated at Harrow School and at Trinity College, Cambridge. As a cricketer, Buxton was a right-handed middle-order batsman and a right-arm medium pace bowler. He was in the Cambridge University cricket team for four years and won a Blue in each year by appearing in the annual University Match against Oxford University. He was captain of the Cambridge team in the rain-ruined and drawn 1888 University Match. Immediately after that game, he was picked for the Gentlemen v Players match at The Oval, one of the Gentlemen's less distinguished performances, with the game lost almost in a single day.

Buxton was not prolific with either bat or ball. He developed earlier as a bowler and bowled little after he left Cambridge; his best bowling figures came in his second match for the university side, against a team raised by A. J. Webbe, when he finished the first innings by taking five wickets for 16 runs and followed that with five for 90 in the second innings for match figures of 10 for 106. He did not take five wickets in an innings in any other match. His highest score for Cambridge was only 63, but playing for MCC against the Cambridge University side in 1889, he scored an unbeaten 108, his only century.

== Rackets player ==
Buxton was also a prominent rackets player, representing both Harrow School and Cambridge University. In 1888 he won the first Amateur Singles Championship to be held at Queen's Club in London.

== Director of his family's brewing company and suicide ==
The Buxton family was involved in the Truman, Hanbury, Buxton & Co brewing company which had originated in the East End of London but had expanded to Burton upon Trent. Cyril Buxton was a director of the company. In 1892, he was troubled by depression, allegedly brought on by liver disease, and was staying at his father's estate in Essex; he told his nurse he was going downstairs and when she went to look for him, she found him dead with a gun at his side.

== See also ==
- List of Cambridge University Cricket Club players
