= Winterhalder & Hofmeier =

Former German clock manufacturer

Winterhalder and Hofmeier goes back to Winterhalder Uhrenfabrik in the Black Forest, a clock manufacturer from 1810. It was further manifested from 1850 under the new name Winterhalder & Hofmeier. In 1869 the company was renamed M. Winterhalder & Hofmeier, Friedenweiler und Schwaerzenbach, in Neustadt. From 1908 the new name was M. Winterhalder & Hofmeier GmbH. The company was part of the Black Forest clockmaker industry as its factory was located in Titisee-Neustadt and surroundings and as it subscribed to high quality standards. The company existed until 1933. It is regarded as one of the finest Victorian clockmakers of the time.

== Origins of the company ==
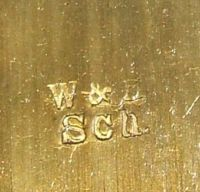
Engraved initial letters on back of Winterhalder & Hofmeier clocks from Schwaerzenbach, Black Forest, Germany

The firm Winterhalder Uhrenfabrik was established in 1810 by Thomas Winterhalder. Even his grandfather Nikolaus Winterhalder (1710-1743) made quality Black Forest clocks with wooden cogs and weights from stones. Thomas moved in 1816 with his three sons Matthäus, Karl und Thomas to Friedenweiler where he lived in an old house ("Altes Haus") which he had bought from a monastery. Matthäus Winterhalder (1799–1863) took over the work rooms in 1830. In 1850 his relative Johannes Hofmeier (1802-1876) from Schwaerzenbach, which is nowadays a part of Titisee-Neustadt joined and they formed the company Winterhalder & Hofmeier. Clocks were marked from there on with the initials W & H Sch.

== Company in expansion ==
The next generation, i. e. Anton, Karl, Thomas und Johannes, changed firm name and responsibility in 1869 ("oHG"). The third generation formed on December 19, 1908, a company of limited liability (Gesellschaft mit beschränkter Haftung). All partners of that company were brothers or cousins to each other. They delivered parts from their own separate firms to the common Winterhalder & Hofmeier company. At that time the firm had (including homeworkers) about 800 employees and a turnover of one million Mark.

== Decline of the company in World War I ==
Orders from the United Kingdom declined just before World War I. War was anticipated by his customers, so Linus Winterhalder agreed in the UK in London with his customers to grant a delay of payments from one month to three months. Orders then came in, but he did not receive any more payments after World War I began. The company was in financial danger. During the First World War production had to change to war material, especially ignitors for shells.

== Insolvency in Nazi Germany ==
After First World War former export markets were no longer in need for Winterhalder precision clocks because of import duties, Hyperinflation in the Weimar Republic, Great Depression and competing mass products. Linus Winterhalder tried in August 1932 to revive exports of his clocks to the United Kingdom, but died in London on August 18, 1932, by a heat stroke and heart attack. After his death the company Winterhalder & Hofmeier had to stop production in 1933 due to lack of liquidity. The buildings of the company were set under economic control. In 1937 the buildings of the company were sold in a compulsory auction in 1937 and came to the city of Neustadt. On June 2, 1937, the company was struck off the commercial register.

== Antique precision clocks ==
Clocks from Winterhalder & Hofmeier are mechanical precision clocks with the quality standards of Black Forest craftsmanship. The numbers of the dial face are in Roman numerals. The dial face is embraced by wood. The clocks can be identified by the engraved W & H SCH initial letters. Most of the clocks were made from 1850 to 1933. Bracket clocks and grandfather clocks were mainly exported to the UK, Ireland and the United States, others to Russia, Japan and China. Nowadays these clocks are demanded in the antique trade on the former North American export market. A private collection of Winterhalder & Hofmeier clocks is located in Schwaerzenbach, a part of the city of Titisee-Neustadt.

== See also ==
- German Clock Road

== Literature ==
- (de) Gerd Bender: Die Uhrenmacher des hohen Schwarzwaldes und ihre Werke, Band II. Verlag Müller, Villingen, ohne Datum.
- Karl Kochmann: Lenzkirch Clock Factory (Part 1), Winterhalder & Hofmeier Clocks (Part 2). Merritt's Antiques Inc., Douglassville, PA 19518, USA 2005. ISBN 0-933396-16-3.
- (als) Roland H. Bueb: Winterhalder & Hofmeier. Präzisionsuhre usem Schwarzwald (quality clocks from Black Forest). In: Alemannisch dunkt üs guet, Heft 2/2011, p. 58
