= Aktiengesellschaft für Uhrenfabrikation Lenzkirch =

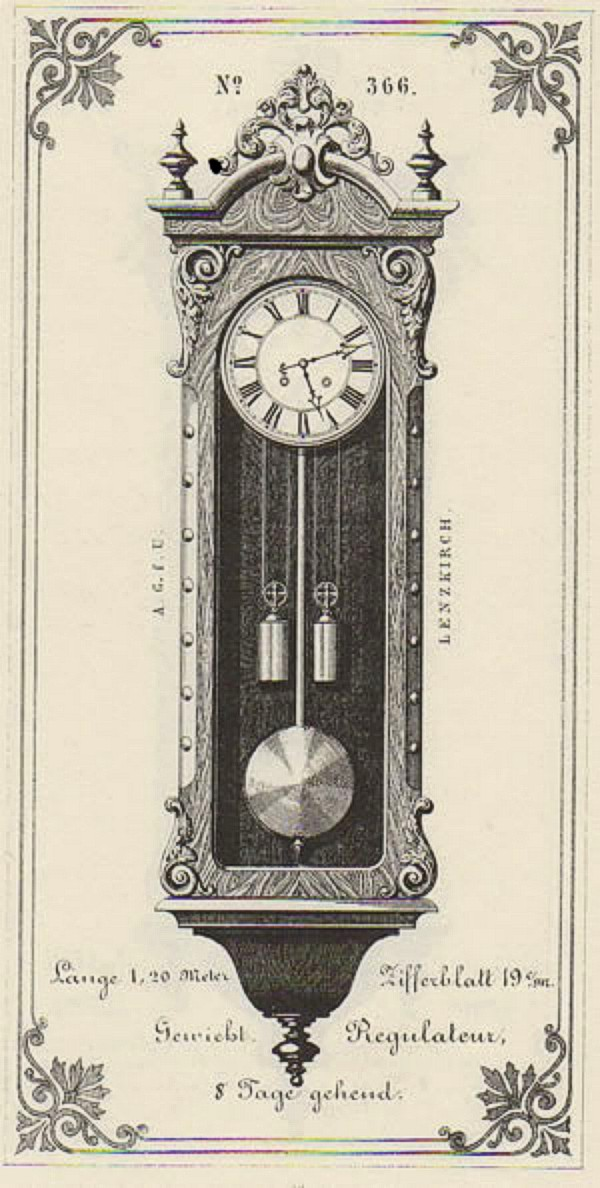

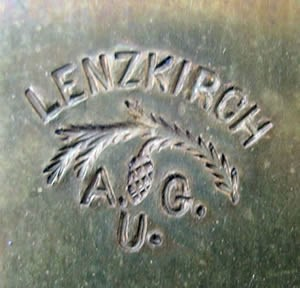

Aktiengesellschaft für Uhrenfabrikation Lenzkirch (Public company for clockmaking Lenzkirch) was founded in 1851 in the village of Lenzkirch in Baden by Eduard Hauser who had trained in France and Switzerland. It is in the tradition of Black Forest clockmakers. Hauser, the son of a teacher, was born on 21 August 1825 and gained experience of making music boxes with Johann George Schopperle. During this same period he gained a knowledge of metalworking, precision work and the design of musical instruments, as well as a proficiency in the composing of music.

The firm acquired a reputation for building particularly fine regulators. Up to the 1920s it still produced regulators with compensated pendulums and precision movements. The firm was later taken over by Junghans and the factory closed down in 1932, at which period the market for wall regulators had collapsed.

== Bibliography ==
- Lenzkircher Uhren 1851–2001. Aus der Geschichte einer bemerkenswerten Uhrmacherzeit
