= Theodor Ketterer =

German clockmaker

Theodor Ketterer (1815 - 1884) was a Black forest clockmaker who worked in Furtwangen, (Germany).

Although his cuckoo clocks were not as popular and known as the ones made by the Beha company, they were of the highest quality and made in low numbers.

Both the cases and movements were similar to the Behas; however, there are some differences.

== See also ==
- Johann Baptist Beha
- Emilian Wehrle

== Bibliography ==
- Kochmann, Karl (2005): Black Forest Clockmaker and the Cuckoo Clock.
