= Tittleshall =

Village in Norfolk, England

Coordinates: 52.75434°N 0.80361°E

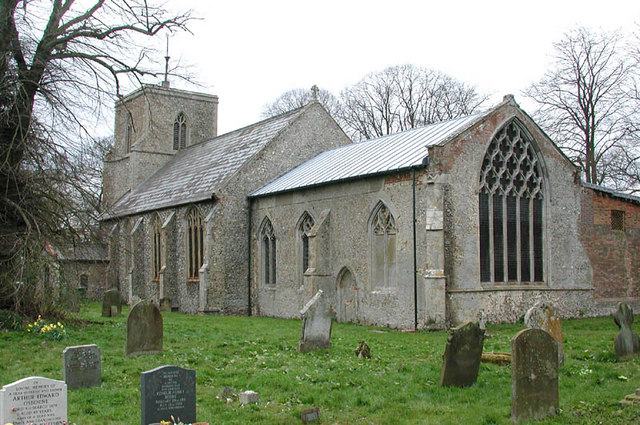
- St Mary, Tittleshall

- Location within Norfolk
- Area: 13.82 km^{2} (5.34 sq mi)
- Population: 406 (2011 census)
  - Density: 29/km^{2} (75/sq mi)
- OS grid reference: TF 893 211
- Civil parish: Tittleshall
- District: Breckland
- Shire county: Norfolk
- Region: East
- Country: England
- Sovereign state: United Kingdom
- Post town: KING'S LYNN
- Postcode district: PE32
- Dialling code: 01328
- Police: Norfolk
- Fire: Norfolk
- Ambulance: East of England

Tittleshall is a village and civil parish in the English county of Norfolk.

== Correct pronunciation ==
"Tittershall"; "Tittsal"

== Location ==
The village and parish of Tittleshall has an area of 1376 hectares or 13.82 km^{2} (5.34 sq mi). The parish is bordered to the north with the parishes of Raynham and Colkirk, to the west with Wellingham All Saints, to the south with the parishes of Litcham and Mileham and to the east with the parishes Whissonsett. The western edge of the parish also marks the border between the local government districts of Breckland, of which Tittleshall is part, and the district of King's Lynn and West Norfolk.

The Village is situated approximately 12 km (7.5 mi) south-west of the town of Fakenham, 18 km (11 mi) north-east of the town of Swaffham, and 40 km (25 mi) north-west of the city of Norwich.

=== Population ===
In the 2011 census had a population of 406 in 161 households. For the purposes of local government, the parish falls within the district of Breckland.

== History ==
The village name of Tittleshall is thought to derive from the Old English for Tyttel's nook. The earliest evidence of human activity within the parish are a number of Neolithic pits and ditches as well as a prehistoric pit. At least three ring ditches have also been discovered, along with a double ring ditch containing cremation pits.

=== The Domesday Book ===
Tillleshall has an entry in the Domesday Book of 1086 where its population, land ownership and productive resources were extensively detailed. In the survey Tittleshall is recorded by the name of Titeshala. The main tenants were Wymer from William de Warenne, and Ralph Sturmy from Ralph Baynard. The survey also lists that for the Wymer tenancy, there had always been 7 smallholders on this land. Meadow 6 acres (24,000 m^{2}), always 3 1/2 ploughs, woodland, 40 pigs and 1 fishery. Value then 20s, now 30. For Ralph Sturmy's tenancy there were 12 villagers, now 8. Then and later 4 smallholders, now 14. Then and later 6 slaves, now 2. Meadow 10 acres (40,000 m^{2}), always 2 ploughs in lordship. Then and later 4 men's ploughs, now 2. Woodland, 100 pigs; always 1 mill. Then 6 head of cattle. Then 30 pigs, now 19. Then 100 sheep, now 80. Then 40 goats, now 73. 4 beehives. Also 1 Freeman, acres 6 acres (24,000 m^{2}). Value then 70s, now the same. Also 1 church, acres 6 acres (24,000 m^{2}), value 5d. The whole has 9 furlongs in length and 1/2 league in width, tax 5d.

=== Tittleshall Murder ===
In 1853 the village was the scene of the murder of Lorenz Beha, a German watchmaker, by William Thomson.

== Notable buildings ==
=== Parish church of Saint Mary ===
The parish church of Saint Mary has a nave built in the perpendicular style which is illuminated with transomed windows. There is a canonical sundial on the south wall. The chancel and west tower are in the decorated style. The chancel has a large Decorated five-light window with reticulated tracery, and there is an elaborately moulded tower arch on the west tower. The church has a Kingpost roof.

The church was used over many years by members of the Coke family who had bought the Tittleshall manor following the reformation, as part of their expansion of the Holkham Estate. Saint Mary's was chosen as the final resting place for many of the Coke family during the post medieval period. There are a number of Coke family monuments at Saint Mary's dating from 1598 up unto the building of the family mausoleum at Holkham in the 1870s, including memorials to Edward Coke and to his first wife Bridget Paston.

On the west wall of the nave there is an old Tittleshall School honours board which bears the names of eighteen children who passed scholarships to grammar school during the first sixty years of the twentieth century. Several of these names also appear on the war memorial.

== Notable residents ==
- Edward Coke, English jurist and Member of Parliament whose writings on the common law were the definitive legal texts for nearly 150 years
- William Hoste, Royal Navy captain during the Napoleonic Wars
- E. W. Bullinger, noted and controversial Anglican scholar, served as parish curate in Tittleshall from 1863 to 1866.
- Reginald Digby (1867–1927), cricketer; born at Tittleshall
