= Lorenz Beha =

Lorenz Beha (c.1825–1853) was a German watchmaker and silversmith living in Britain who was murdered in Norfolk in 1853.

== Life ==
Coming from Baden Baden in south-west Germany his profession, locality and rare surname would indicate he was a brother or cousin of watchmaker Johann Baptist Beha (1815-1898). Presuming the former he was son of Vinzenz Beha (1764-1868). Some sources say he was eldest son of Johann but given the mutual ages, this would appear, although not impossible, unlikely.

Lorenz was making watches from at least 1849.

He moved to Britain around 1850 and lived in St Stephen's Plain in Norwich. He had a shop in Norwich with two paid employees. He left these employees in charge of his shop while he went on travels. Selling watches and jewellery on credit to country customers, and collecting payments due from earlier sales.

On 25 November 1853 Beha was walking through Norfolk on the road from Wellingham to Tittleshall. He had a kerchief on a stick over his shoulder, containing his wares; gold and silver watches and a box of jewellery plus a quantity of cash. He was last seen alive at around 1pm by two ploughmen, the Roper brothers, in an adjacent field.

Beha was murdered by multiple blows to the head with a hatchet. He was robbed of watches and cash and the hatchet was left nearby. Around 3pm a John Robinson (contemporary accounts say "Roberson"), a butcher from Tittleshall, was passing and saw a trail of blood leading from the road to a ditch at the roadside. While Robinson was inspecting the scene a gig containing Mrs Digby and a Miss Shepherd accompanied by two ponies carrying her sons, the sons of Rev Digby of St Mary's Church in Tittleshall, rode up, delaying their journey home from Dereham market. They were joined a minute or two later by Rev Digby on his horse. They jointly investigated and found Beha on the other side of the hedge, lying in a ditch, having been pulled there by his collar. His jewellery box lay nearby unopened as did his umbrella. His kerchief was open and all contents gone. A wood hatchet lay nearby covered in blood and hair and was clearly the murder weapon. His trouser pockets were turned inside out but his waistcoat pocket had his personal watch still running, which the robber had overlooked. Beha's injuries included a severe blow to the back of the neck which had almost severed the head. Each of the four further blows to the face would equally have caused death.

Robinson aided by the Roper brothers put the body in his cart and took it to the Griffin Inn public house (later known as the Golden Wyvern). A surgeon, J. Jump of Litcham examined the body on the following Monday.

Beha was buried in Our Lady of the Annunciation RC Church in King's Lynn which had been his place of worship, as a Roman Catholic with few options in the 1850s. The church was rebuilt in 1897 but Beha's grave is still visible.

== Investigation and Trial ==
A William Webster (also a butcher) driving a cart from Tittleshall to Wellingham shortly before 1pm on the day in question had spotted a man in the "plantation" behind the hedge where Beha's body was found. The man appeared to be trying to hide behind the hedge. In this small community the man was quickly identified as 21-year-old William Thompson, a farm labourer and wood-cutter who lived with his father. That evening the parish constable, John Hooks, with a second constable called Moore, arrived at his house and a search revealed blood-stained clothes. His hatchet was also missing.

A colleague of Beha, a Mr Herman, also a watchmaker and occasional business partner of Beha said he had given one of his own watches for Beha to deliver to a man in Tittleshall. This watch was neither on Beha nor revealed in the first search of Thompson's home. A second search revealed an all-damning watch inscribed "L. Beha maker", in a shoe a second with the same inscription up a chimney and a third watch inscribed "S. Herman" in a pouch. A large amount of cash including two Lynn and Lincolnshire Bank £5 notes (unlikely to be currency held by a farm labourer) and several gold sovereigns were found together with a number of watch keys.

He was arrested and held at the local pub (where Beha's body still lay) owned by Elizabeth Bacon. Thompson was identified by Webster and the Roper brothers. He was charged with murder and robbery and moved to the cells at Norwich Castle.

The trial in April 1854 was under the county judge Sir James Parke and took place at Norfolk Assizes in Norwich. Prosecution was led by Mr Bulver and Mr Evans. Defence was by Mr Carlos Cooper. Thompson's defence was that he had been walking along the road and went to investigate and found a third man over Beha's body when he was spotted by Webster. He claimed he fought the man and got covered in blood. The stranger then gave him the watches and cash to buy his silence.

Thompson was found guilty and sentenced to hang, He was taken from a cell at Norwich Castle on Saturday 8 April 1854 to a gibbet erected on Castle Hill. A large crowd attended. The Service of the Dead was read by Rev Ordinary. He was taken to the gallows and a hood put on his head and noose around his neck. He struggled for five minutes after the drop then died. He was pronounced dead and a death mask was taken before he was buried in the grounds of Norwich Castle.

== Trivia ==
One of Lorenz Beha's clocks was purchased by the King's Lynn Museum.

William Thompson's death mask is on display in Norwich Castle Museum.
