= Armand Couaillet =

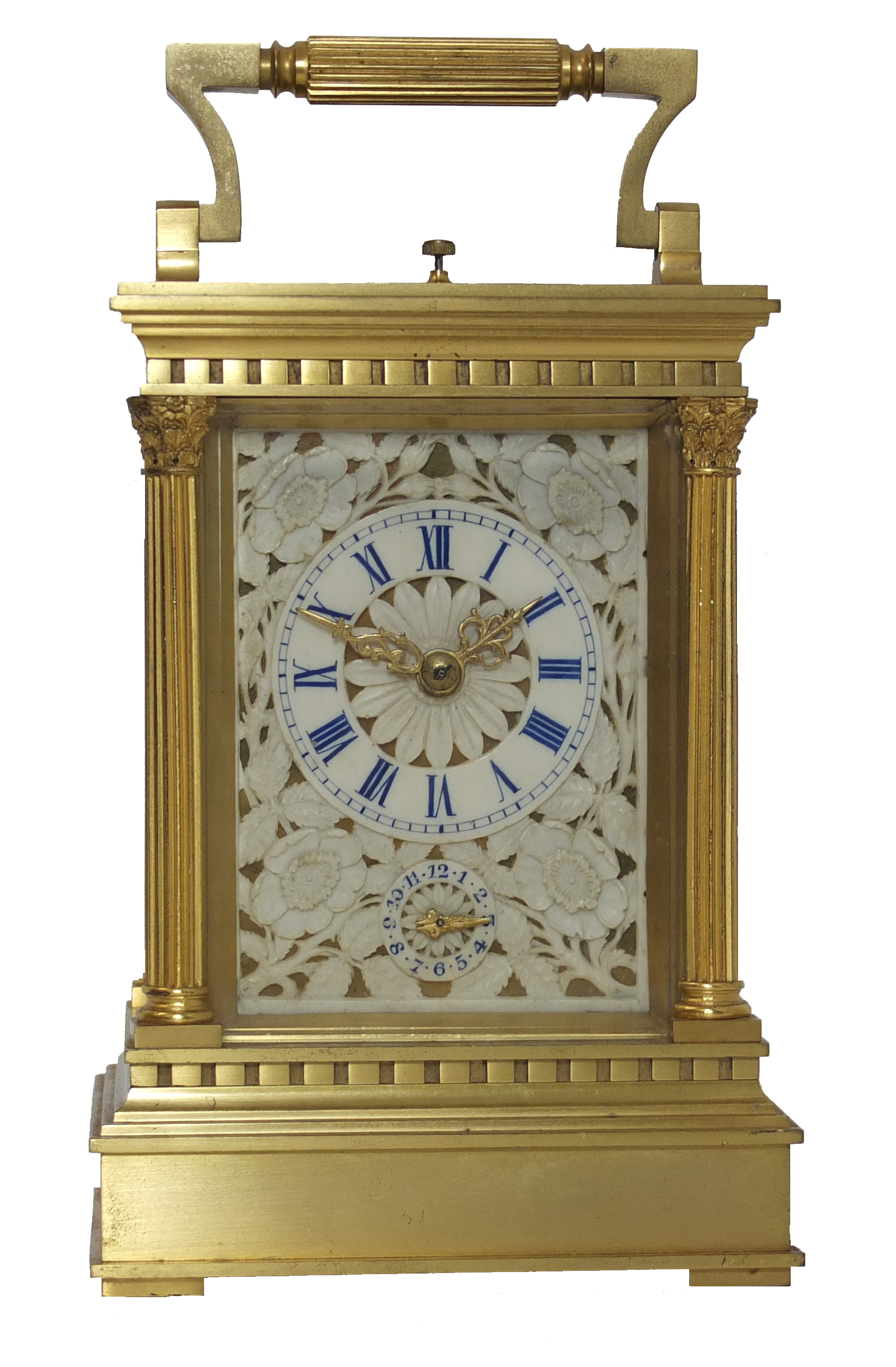
Carriage clock, Armand Couaillet, Saint-Nicolas d'Aliermont Museum

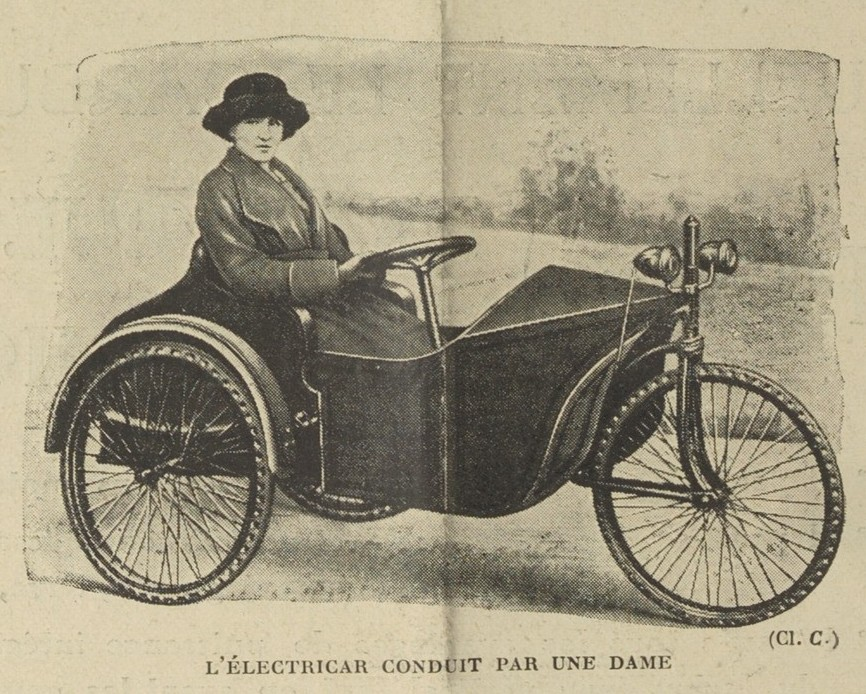
The electricar (1920)

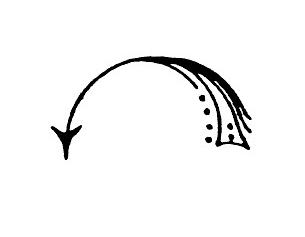
Couaillet marks

Armand Couaillet (1865–1954) was a French clock maker from Saint-Nicolas-d'Aliermont in Normandy.

In 1890 Couaillet started a business producing carriage clocks; shortly afterwards his three brothers join the business. By the turn of the century, the company employed about 100 workers and were producing 4000 carriage clocks each month.

On the eve of World War I, The Couaillet brothers employed 300 people and their catalog listed 250 models of clocks, but during the war, the focus of production switched to precision mechanical components for fuses, parts for aircraft engines and field telegraph systems.

In 1919, following a trip to the United States, he designed and initiated production of the “Électricar”, a lightweight, three-wheeled, one-person electric automobile. However, only 250 units were sold, as the market demanded vehicles with internal combustion engines. Simultaneously, he relaunched his horological business, focusing primarily on the production of alarm clocks and timers. In 1925, the business went bankrupt and subsequently shut down.
