= Eisenbach =

- Municipality
- Coat of arms

- Location of Eisenbach within Breisgau-Hochschwarzwald district
- Interactive map of Eisenbach
- Location within Germany Location within Baden-Württemberg
- Coordinates: 47°57′50″N 8°16′19″E
- Country: Germany
- State: Baden-Württemberg
- Admin. region: Freiburg
- District: Breisgau-Hochschwarzwald
- Subdivisions: 4

Government
  - Mayor (2020–28): Karlheinz Rotke

Area
  - Total: 28.78 km^{2} (11.11 sq mi)
- Elevation: 944 m (3,097 ft)

Population (2025-12-31)
  - Total: 2,103
  - Density: 73.07/km^{2} (189.3/sq mi)
- Time zone: UTC+01:00 (CET)
  - Summer (DST): UTC+02:00 (CEST)
- Postal codes: 79871
- Dialling codes: 07657
- Vehicle registration: FR
- Website: www.eisenbach.de

Eisenbach is a town in the district of Breisgau-Hochschwarzwald in Baden-Württemberg in Germany.

It lies at an altitude between 800 and 1130m above sea level in the Breg valley.

== Etymology ==
The name of the town is said to come from the brown iron ore and pyrolusite which was mined in the region periodically from 1478 until 1942 (The German word for iron is Eisen, resulting in the town name "Eisenbach").

== Local industries ==
Eisenbach was once known for its strong watchmaking industry, as traditional German cuckoo clocks were invented in the black forest region of South-West Germany. They were, and still are, commonly produced in the region to be exported elsewhere and are a cultural symbol of the region as well as Germany.

As of 2019, there is a cluster of 9 large industrial companies and numerous smaller companies which produce gears, precision tuned parts, and other mechanical parts. In 2012, there were over 1500 employees in this cluster, 1100 of whom were commuters. The high level of employment in the manufacturing sector is considered unusual in the Black Forest region of Germany, which is more reliant on tourism as a whole.

Eisenbach is designated as an 'Air Spa' or 'Luftkurot', which is a designation German municipalities judged to have clean enough air can receive, and can use the status to charge guests with an additional health resort tax. Tourism in the municipality forms a significant part of its economy.
