= Trumpeter clock =

A trumpeter clock is a type of musical clock that reproduces the trumpeters call. These clocks were made exclusively in the Black Forest region of Germany. They are highly collectible, and many collectors consider the trumpeter clock to be one of the most desirable of all the clocks produced in the region during the second half of the 19th century.

== The first trumpeter clocks ==
Jakob Bäuerle of Furtwangen Germany has been given credit as the first to combine a mechanism that produces a trumpeters call with a clock. This was most likely first done in the year 1857. The first trumpeter clocks were very simple in design, producing a simple bugle call that is reproduced once for each hour. In the later years the musical abilities of the clocks greatly improved, and many examples were made to produce complex musical tunes. Although many different makers made the trumpeter clocks, Emilian Wehrle was without question the undisputed leader of trumpeter clock production and design.

== Variations ==
A trumpeter clock can be found in several different variations. The most common examples are known to collectors as a "blowers" or "German buglers". These examples use a modified cuckoo type movement that produces a simple trumpet like call. Instead of using a wooden cuckoo pipe, these examples have small reed/horn assemblies. This varies from the large trumpeter clocks that use a large bellows system that feeds air into a wind chest. A pinned music wheel controls a series of valves to reproduce a complex musical tune.

== Value ==
The values of trumpeter clocks vary widely with some examples selling for tens of thousands of dollars. While all trumpeter clocks are desirable, the examples that play complex musical tunes are generally more valuable than the simpler "blower" variety. The large heavily carved shelf cases which are adorned with full relief animals have consistently brought the highest prices at auction.
