= Arthur Kenelm Watson =

English cricketer, teacher, and schoolmaster

Arthur Kenelm Watson (23 March 1867 – 2 January 1947) was an English teacher and schoolmaster, and a first-class cricketer active 1886–94 who played for Middlesex and Oxford University. He was born and died in Harrow-on-the-Hill.

Watson played Cricket for Harrow, Oxford University, Middlesex and Norfolk and Suffolk clubs.

Educated at Balliol College, Oxford until 1885, Watson was an Assistant Master at the Rugby School in 1911. He was later headmaster of Queen Elizabeth's Grammar School in Ipswich. When Watson retired as headmaster he exhibited daffodils at shows organised by the Royal Horticultural Society.
