= Bracket clock =

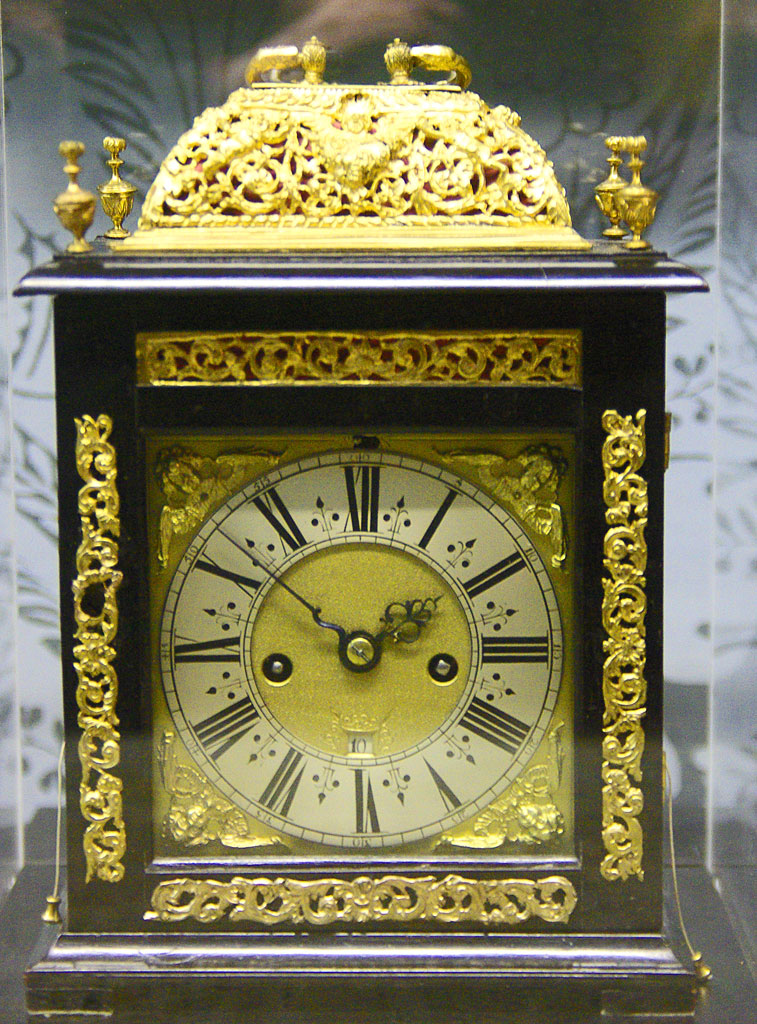
Bracket Clock circa 1700 by Daniel Quare on display at the Walker Art Gallery, Liverpool

A bracket clock is a style of antique portable table clock made in the 17th and 18th centuries. The term originated with small weight-driven pendulum clocks (sometimes called 'true bracket clocks') that had to be mounted on a bracket on the wall to allow room for their hanging weights. When spring-driven clocks were developed, which didn't require hanging weights to power them, they continued to be made in the bracket style. Often they are composed of two matching pieces created as an ensemble: the clock and its small decorative shelf. They are almost always made of wood, often ebony, and often ornamented with ormolu mounts, brass inlay, wood or tortoise shell veneer, or decorative varnish. Since in their day clocks were expensive, and a household would not have one in every room, bracket clocks usually had handles to carry them from room to room.

These clocks were almost always repeaters, that is striking clocks which could be made to repeat the striking of the hours at the pull of a lever or cord. This feature was used before artificial illumination to tell what time it was at night. However, because they were often used in bedrooms where the hourly striking of the bell could disturb sleepers, they either had a knob to silence the hourly striking, or did not strike on the hour at all but only at the pull of the cord. These were called 'silent pull repeaters'.

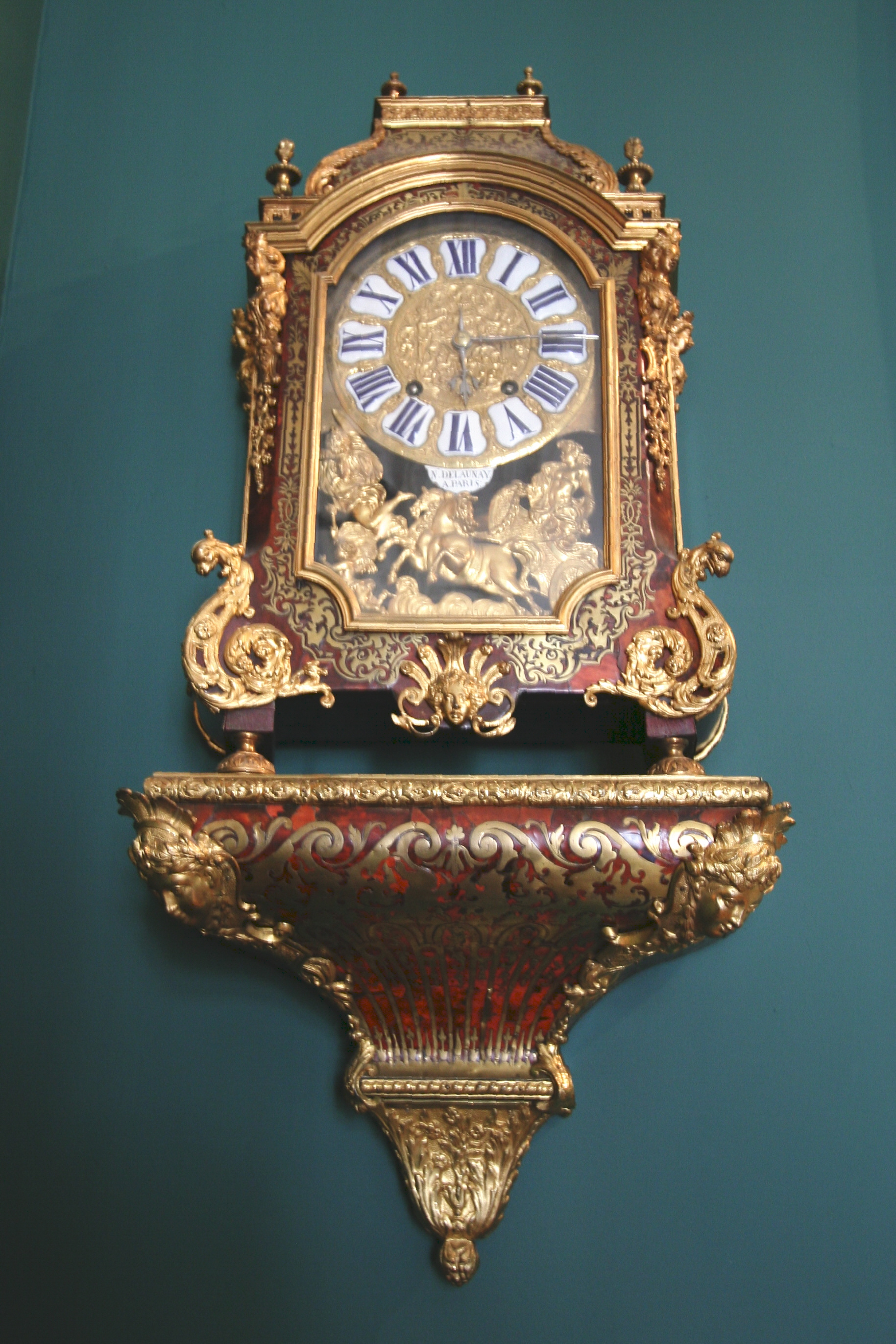
A bracket clock with matching wall bracket, made around 1735 by Nicolas Delaunay, a watchmaker of Paris.

== See also ==
- Lantern clock
- Carriage clock
- Mantel clock

== Footnotes ==
- Media related to Bracket clocks at Wikimedia Commons
