= Kenelm Edward Digby =

English lawyer and civil servant

Sir Kenelm Edward Digby, GCB, KC (9 September 1836 – 21 April 1916) was a British lawyer and civil servant. He was Permanent Under-Secretary of State at the Home Office from 1895 to 1903.

== Biography ==
Digby was born in Wotton-under-Edge in Gloucestershire, England, the son of Hon. and Revd. Kenelm Henry Digby (1811–1891) and his wife Caroline. The Digby county family, established in Dorset, had a history of public service. The Revd. Kenelm Henry Digby was the younger brother of Jane Digby and of Edward Digby, 9th Baron Digby.

Digby went to school at Blakeney in Norfolk and then Harrow School in north-west London. He graduated in 1859 from Corpus Christi College Oxford, and was called to the bar by Lincoln's Inn in 1865. From 1868 to 1875 he taught at Oxford University, and published An Introduction to the History of the Law of Real Property in 1875, which soon became a standard textbook. He was a strong supporter of Gladstonian Liberalism and believed in "the greater importance of giving substantial power to the working classes". Later in his life he was involved in working out fair and effective means of compensating workmen for industrial injuries.

In 1892 Digby was appointed County Court Judge in Derbyshire, and in 1891 he became a bencher of Lincoln's Inn and in 1904 took silk. In 1894 he was unexpectedly approached on behalf of the Liberal Home Secretary, H. H. Asquith, about an appointment as Permanent Under-Secretary of State at the Home Office. However, a strong devotion to public duty weighed in the balance against his fears about his inexperience in administration and public office. In January 1895 Digby was appointed Permanent Under Secretary of State at the Home Office, succeeding Sir Godfrey Lushington.

Digby was created KCB in 1898, retired in September 1903 and was promoted to GCB in 1906. Over the subsequent ten years he sat as a member of numerous departmental committees of inquiry, chairing the Home Office departmental committee on workmen's compensation (1904), and acted as an arbitrator in labour disputes. In 1914 he was appointed a member of the commission to investigate alleged German war atrocities in Belgium.

Digby married Caroline (1848–1926) on 30 August 1870, the second daughter of liberal politician Edward Strutt, 1st Baron Belper. They had four children – two sons and two daughters. One of his daughters was the scientist Lettice Digby and a son, Edward Aylmer Digby, was a barrister and naval officer. One of his grandchildren was Kenelm Hubert Digby, the proposer of the notorious 1933 "King and Country" debate in the Oxford Union, and later Attorney General and judge in Sarawak. Digby died on 21 April 1916 at Studland in Dorset.
