= Vogtsburg =

- Town
- Coat of arms

- Location of Vogtsburg within Breisgau-Hochschwarzwald district
- Interactive map of Vogtsburg
- Location within Germany Location within Baden-Württemberg
- Coordinates: 48°05′21″N 07°37′54″E
- Country: Germany
- State: Baden-Württemberg
- Admin. region: Freiburg
- District: Breisgau-Hochschwarzwald

Government
  - Mayor (2023–31): Benjamin Bohn

Area
  - Total: 37.36 km^{2} (14.42 sq mi)
- Elevation: 190–557 m (623–1,827 ft)

Population (2025-12-31)
  - Total: 6,328
  - Density: 169.4/km^{2} (438.7/sq mi)
- Time zone: UTC+01:00 (CET)
  - Summer (DST): UTC+02:00 (CEST)
- Postal codes: 79235
- Dialling codes: 07662
- Vehicle registration: FR
- Website: www.vogtsburg.de

Vogtsburg im Kaiserstuhl (German pronunciation: [ˈfoːktsbʊʁk ʔɪm ˈkaɪzɐʃtuːl], lit. 'Vogtsburg in the Kaiserstuhl'; Low Alemannic: Vogtsburg im Kaiserstuehl), often referred to as simply Vogtsburg (German pronunciation: [ˈfoːktsbʊʁk]), is a town in the Kaiserstuhl, a volcanic region in the district Breisgau-Hochschwarzwald, Baden-Württemberg. It has a population of about 5,700 and was created on January 1, 1975 through the unification of six former municipalities, initially under the name Oberrotweil, and was renamed to Vogtsburg im Kaiserstuhl in April 1977. With its 5.4 square miles (14 km^{2}) of vineyards, Vogtsburg is the biggest wine producing town in Germany.

== Geography ==
=== Geographic position ===
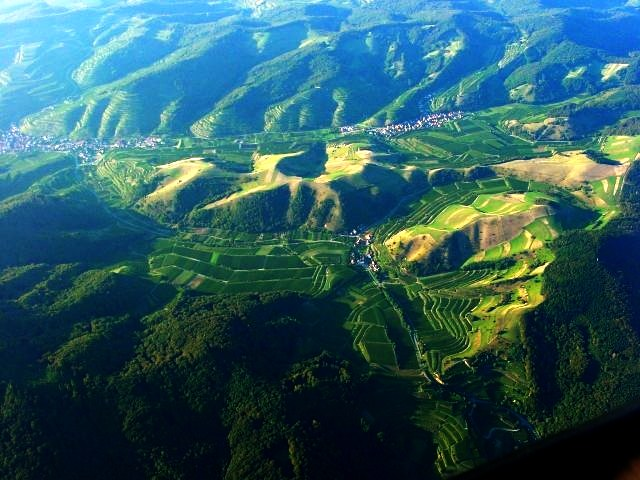
Aerial view of the central Kaiserstuhl

The individual villages of Vogtsburg are embedded in the valleys of the inner Kaiserstuhl (except Burkheim). The horseshoe-shaped mountain range of the Kaiserstuhl opens to the west and forms the border of the area of Vogtsburg. To the west Vogtsburg borders the Rhine and the French region of Alsace.

=== Climate ===
The relatively low height above sea level and the protected position between the Vosges Mountains and the Schwarzwald (the Black Forest) create a nearly Mediterranean microclimate.

=== Geology ===
The mountains of the Kaiserstuhl are a later result of the creation of a great rift (the Rhine Rift) followed by some smaller volcanic activity. The Kaiserstuhl consists of thick layers of loess (100 ft (30 m)), which, together with the special climate, is the main reason for the extraordinary fertility of this area.

=== Neighboring towns ===
- Artzenheim (Alsace)
- Bahlingen
- Baltzenheim (Alsace)
- Bötzingen
- Breisach
- Eichstetten
- Endingen
- Ihringen
- Sasbach

=== Divisions ===
The town Vogtsburg consists of the following Stadtteile or municipal divisions:

- Achkarren
- Bickensohl
- Bischoffingen
- Burkheim
- Oberbergen
- Oberrotweil
- Schelingen

Vogtsburg is composed of nine individual villages. Prior to unification in 1975 the villages of Oberrotweil and Niederrotweil were one political entity. The small hamlet with the original name Vogtsburg belonged to Oberbergen. For this reason the city of Vogtsburg has nine different villages but only seven political districts. Town privileges for the city of Vogtsburg came from Burkheim, which since the Middle Ages was a town despite its small size.

== History ==
Although the city of Vogtsburg is one of the youngest in Germany, the individual villages making it up are mostly more than 1000 years old. The earliest archaeological finds in the village Oberbergen date to the times of the Linear Pottery culture during the Paleolithic era between 4000 and 2500 BC.

Archaeological finds in Bischoffingen give evidence of Neolithic settlers of the Corded Ware culture. Other archeological excavations found flexed burials, which could be dated to the Bronze Age between 1700 and 1200 BC. In more recent history, from 800 BC onwards, there is extensive evidence of Celtic occupation. With the arrival of the Alemanni around 200 AD the Celts seem to have disappeared from the region. The area of Oberbergen is considered to be the most important settlement in South Baden during the era of the Hallstatt culture.

Because of the horseshoe-shaped mountain range of the Kaiserstuhl, which opens only to the west, Vogtsburg was not easily accessible before the introduction of modern roads. This led to a stagnation of development and of the population due to significant emigration until 1870. For about 100 years between 1880 and 1980 the population had been about constant at 5000 inhabitants. From 1980 on the population has increased due to development.

== Gallery ==
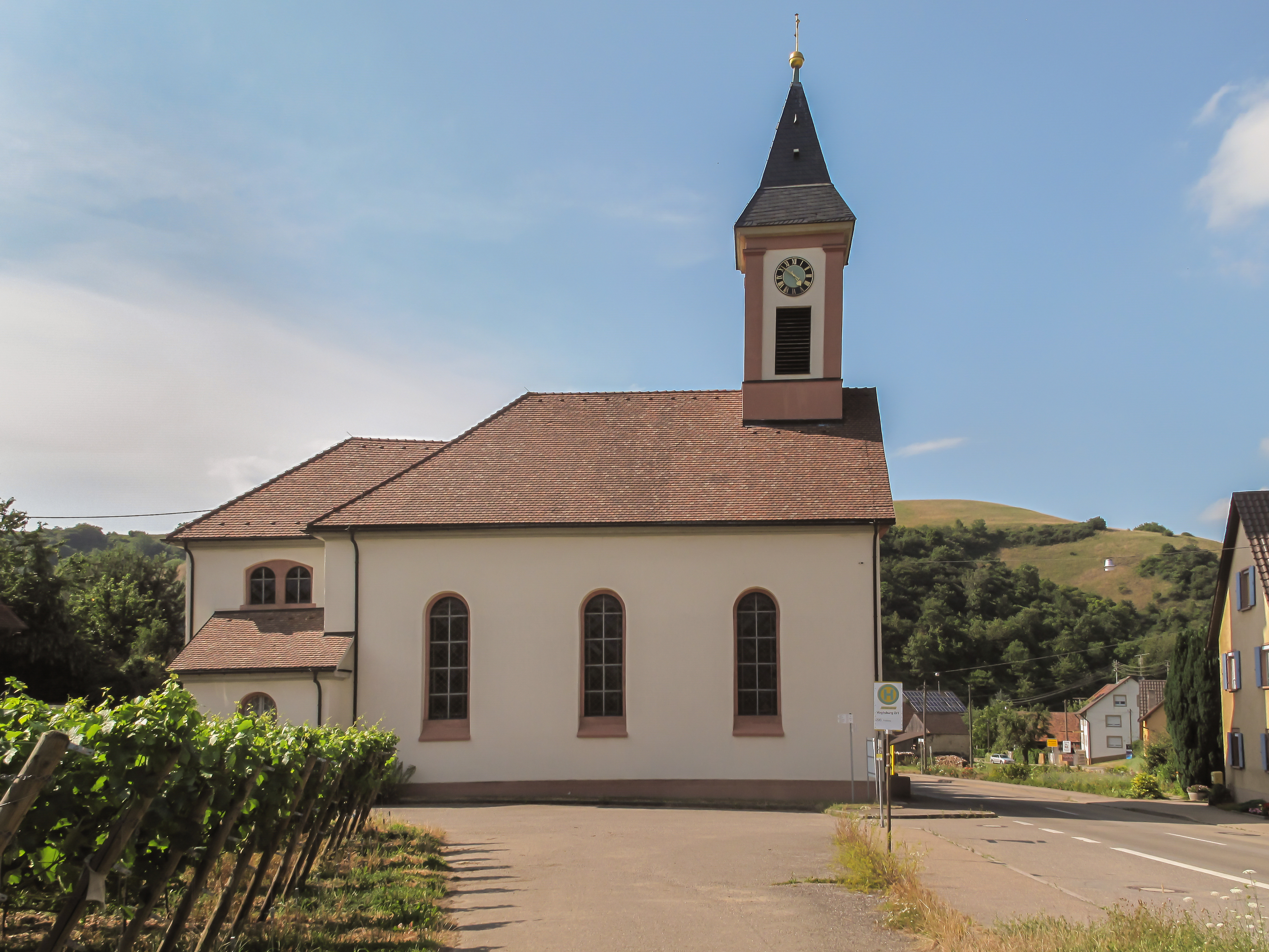
Altvogtsburg, church: die Sankt Romanuskirche

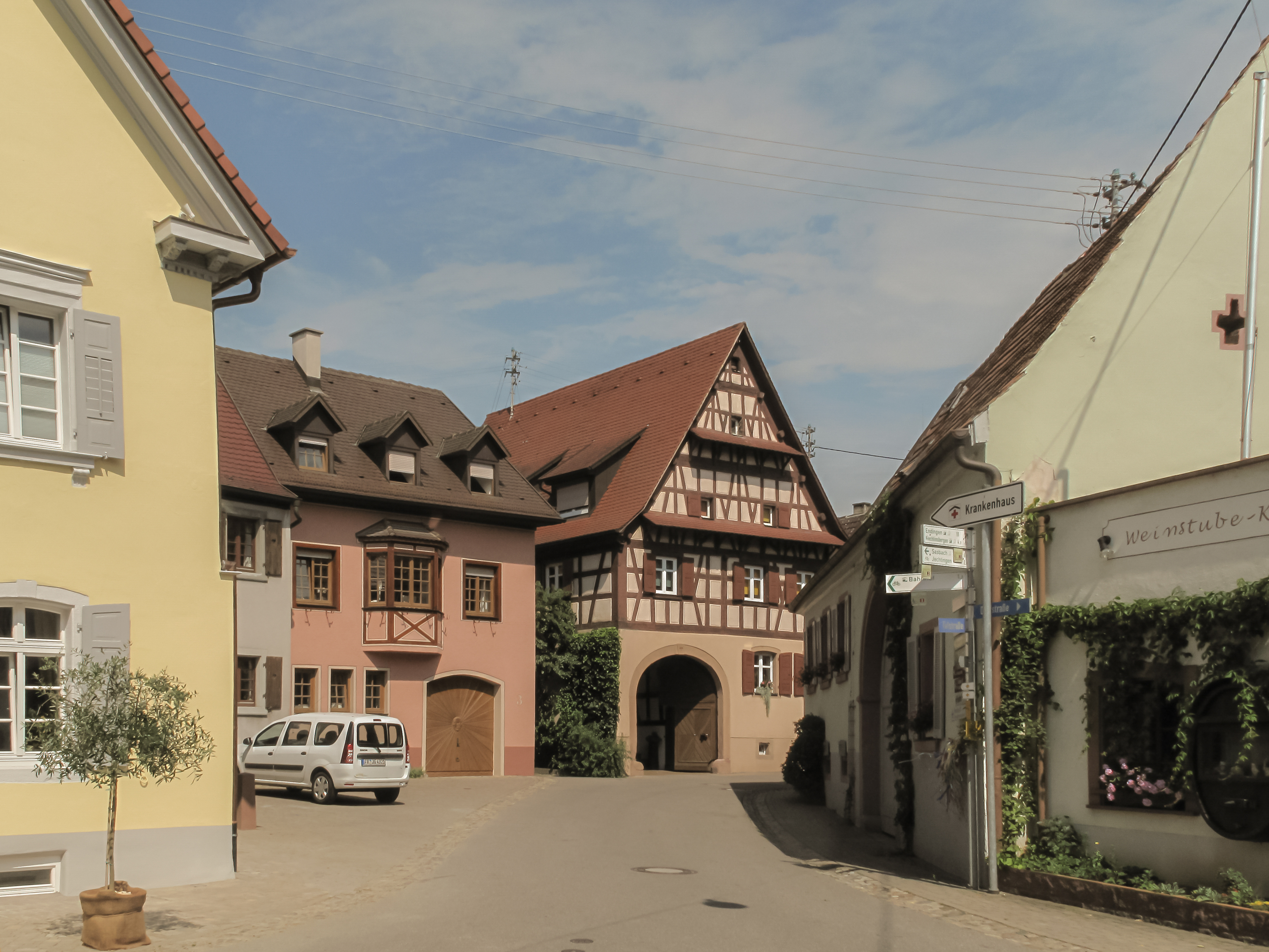
Bischoffingen, view to a street

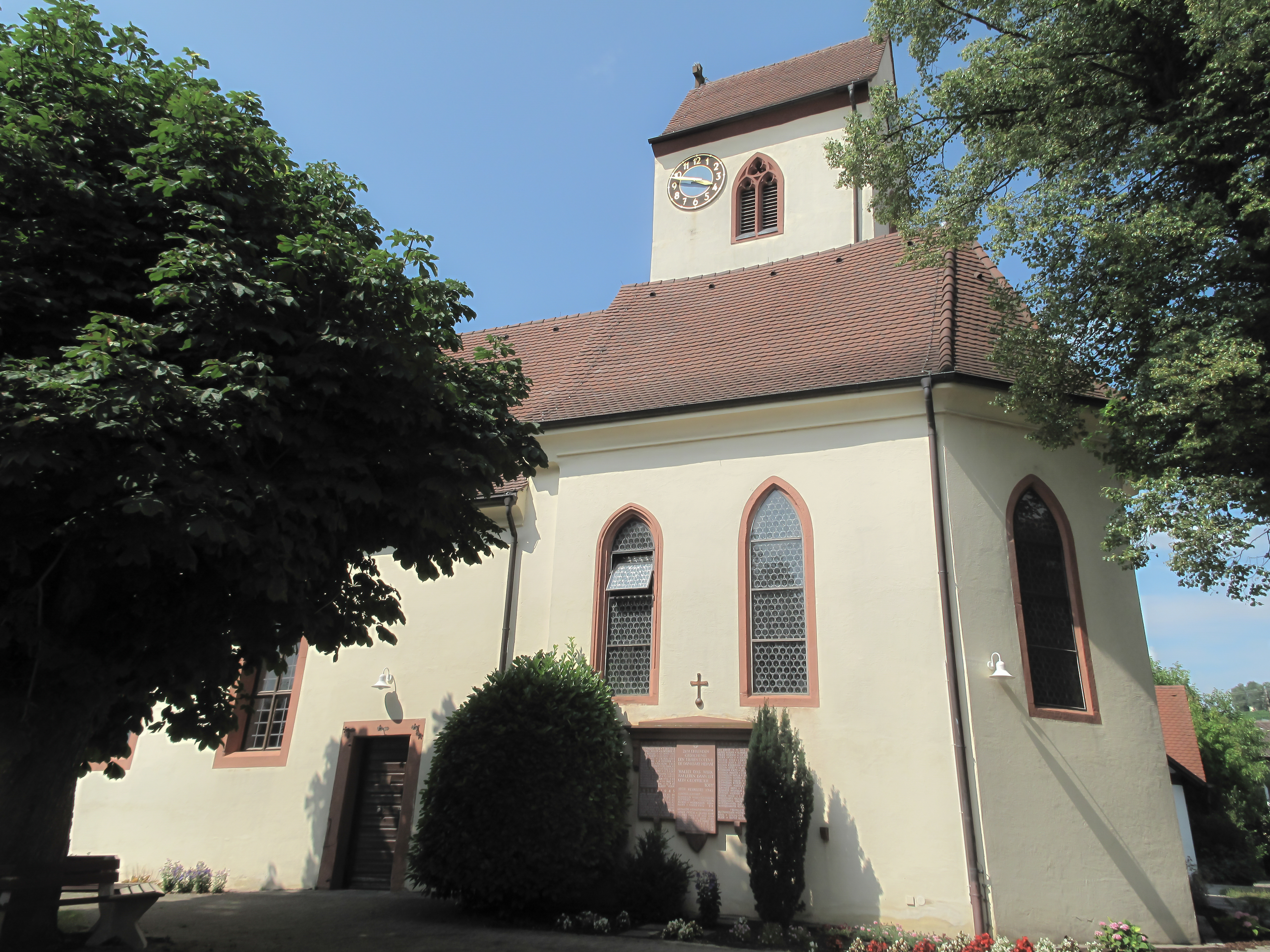
Bisschoffingen, church: die Sankt Laurentiuskirche

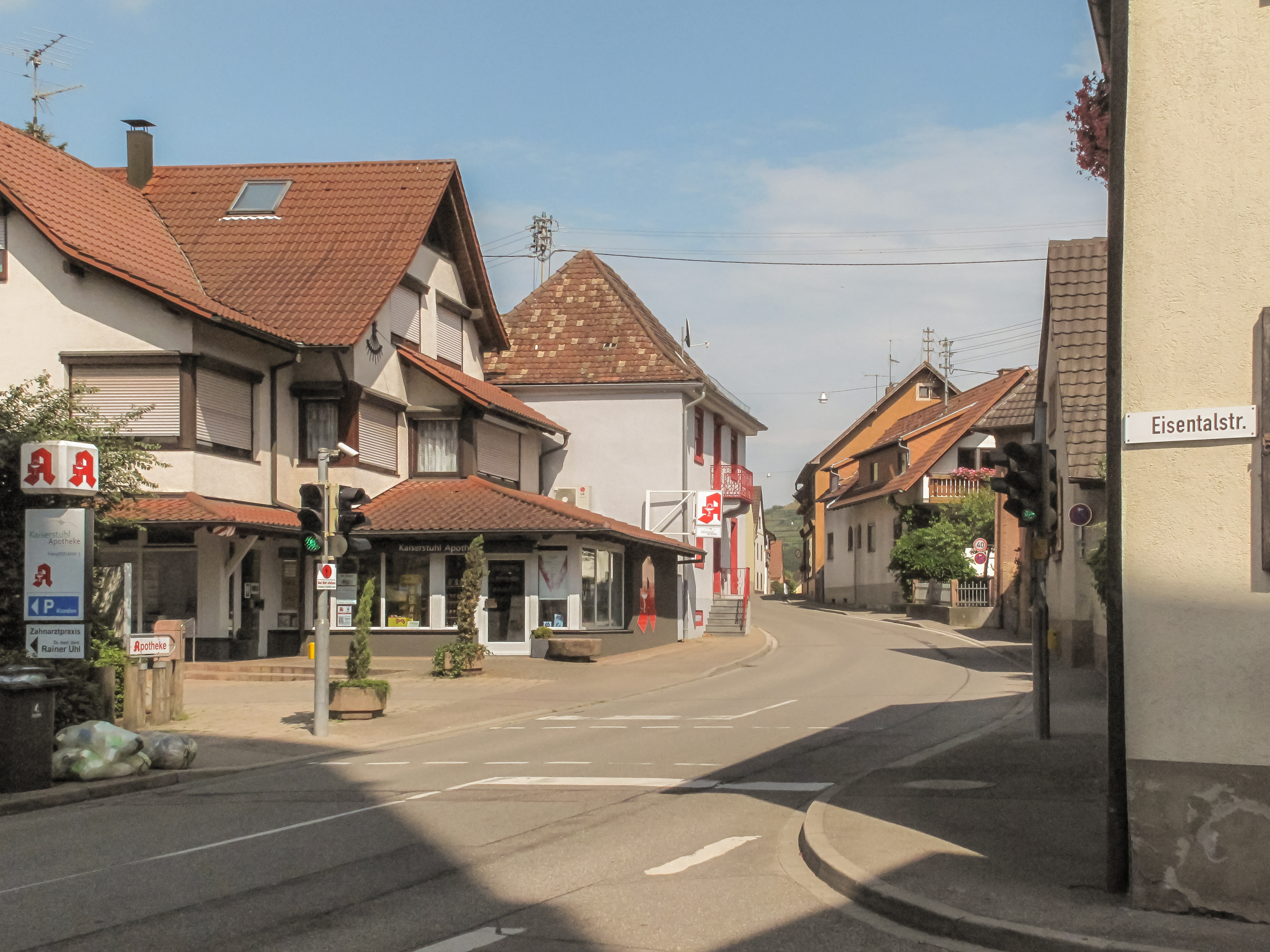
Oberrotweil, view to a street: die Bahnhofstrasse

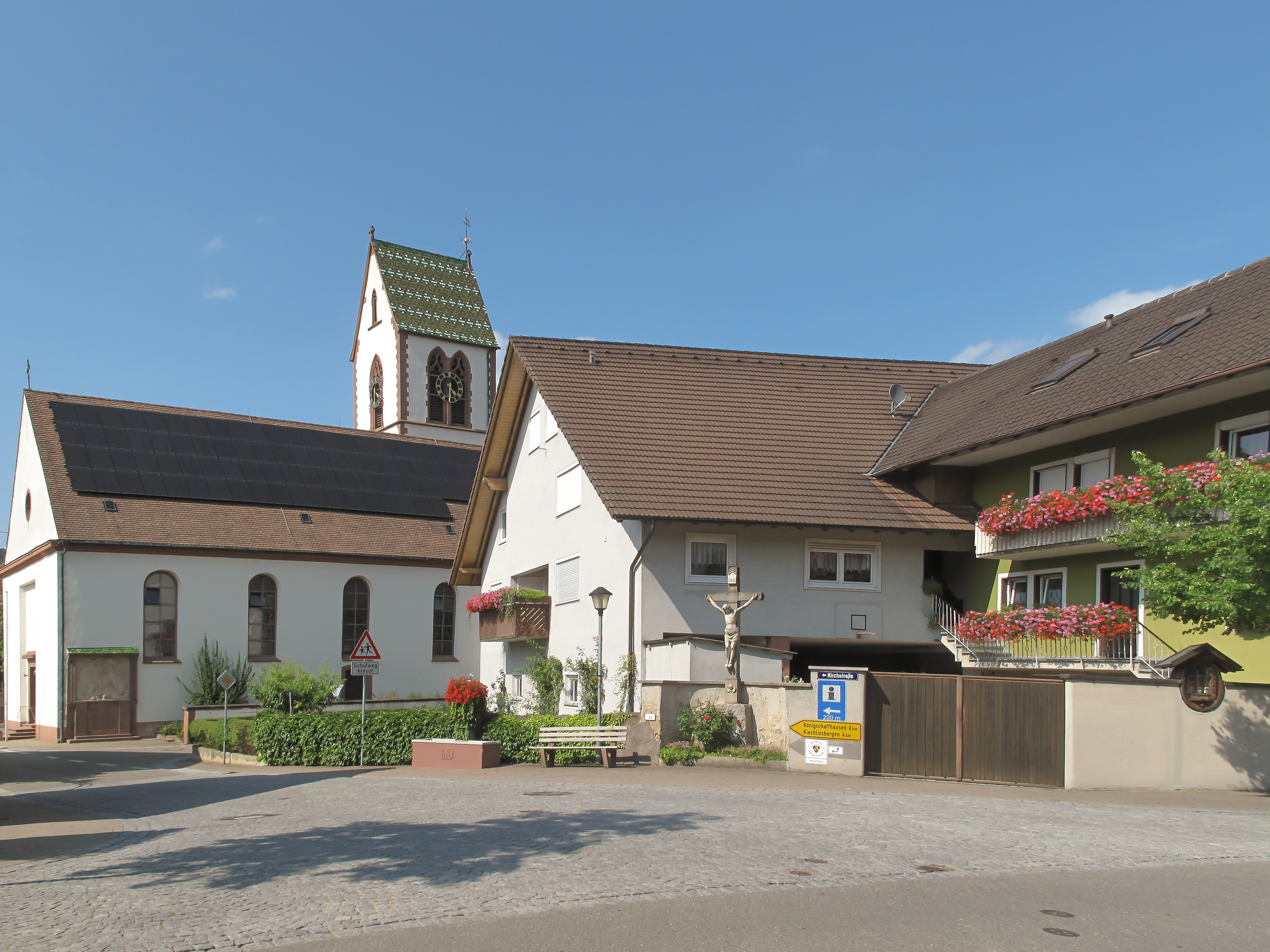
Oberbergen, church: die Sankt Mauritius Kirche
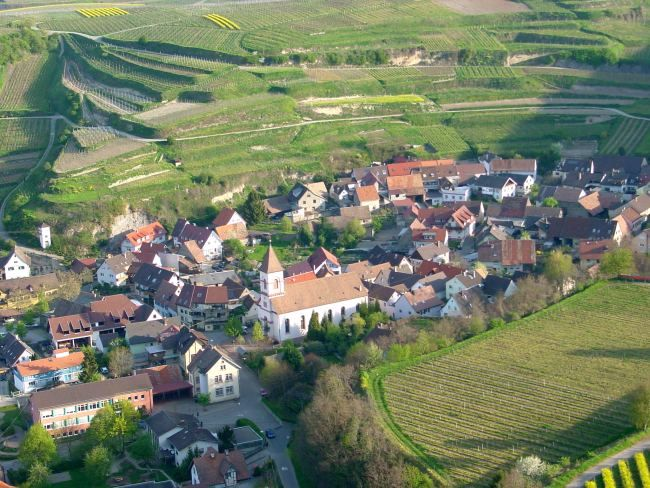
Achkarren, with the ruins of Burg Hoehingen on top of the Schlossberg mountain

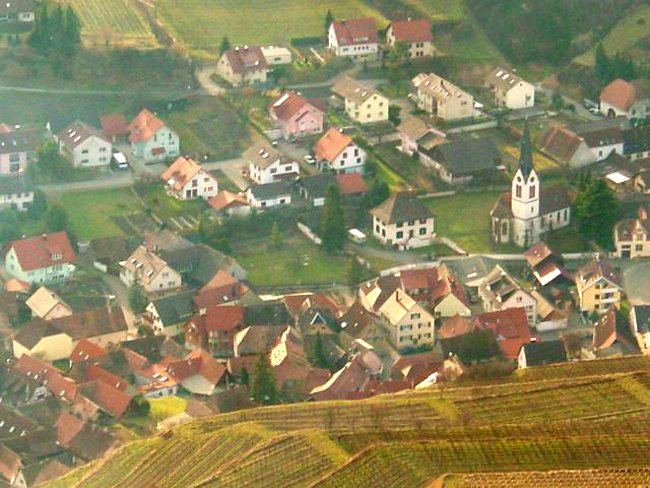
Bickensohl

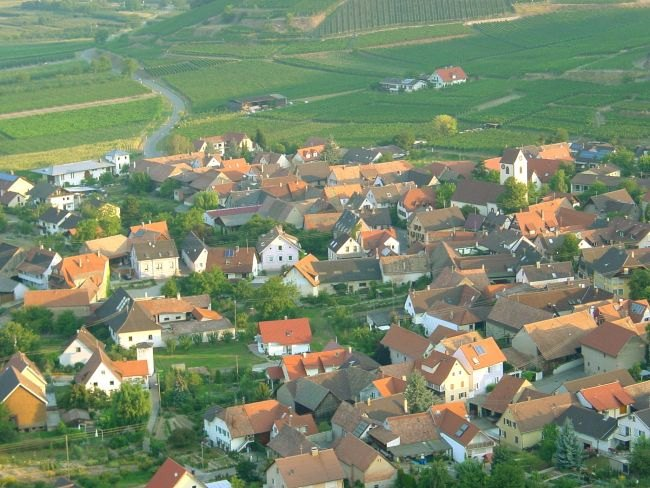
Bischoffingen

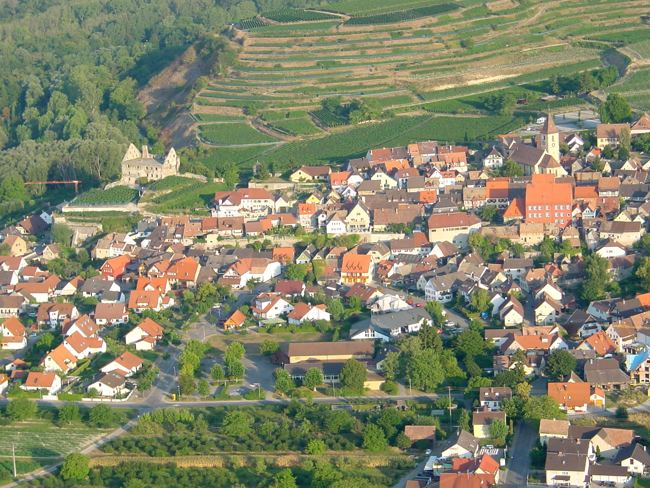
Burkheim, with the ruins of a castle and a quarry pond

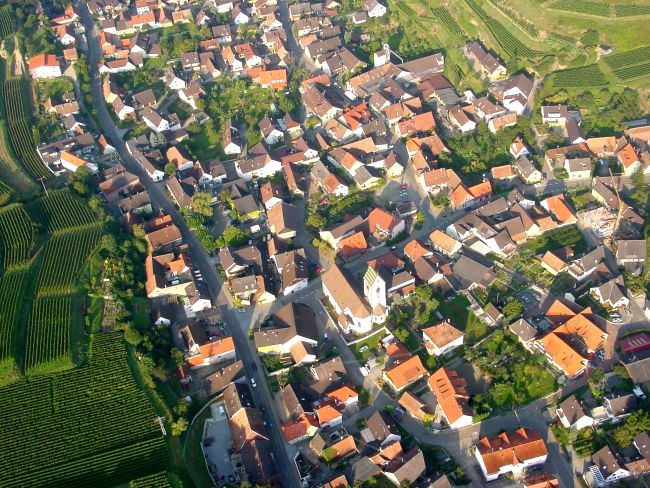
Oberbergen

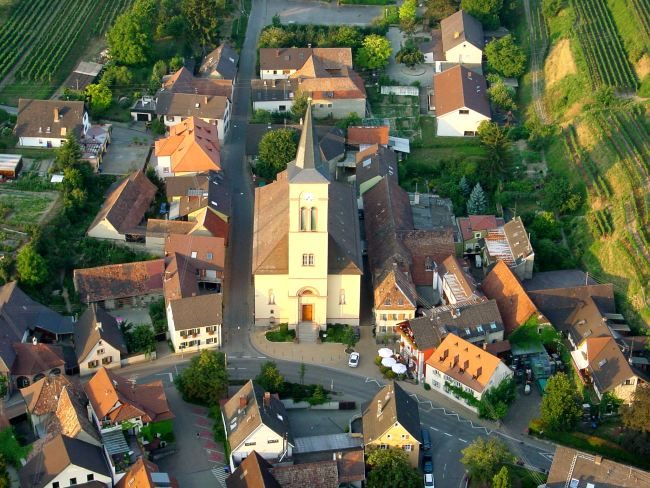
Oberrotweil, the central village where the city council is located

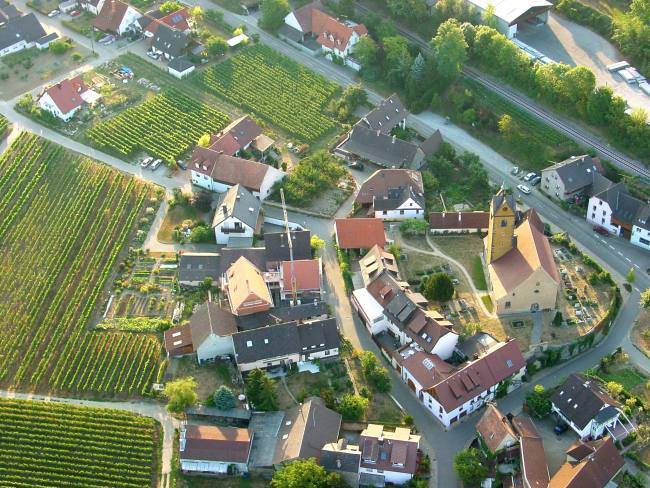
Niederrotweil, politically part of Oberrottweil

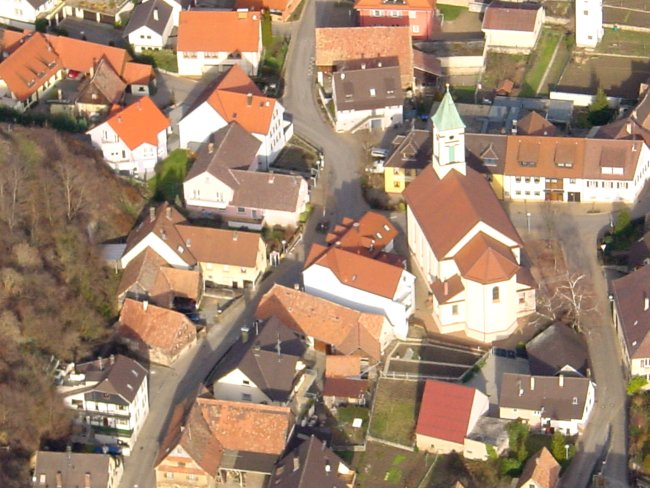
Schelingen, the highest village in Vogtsburg

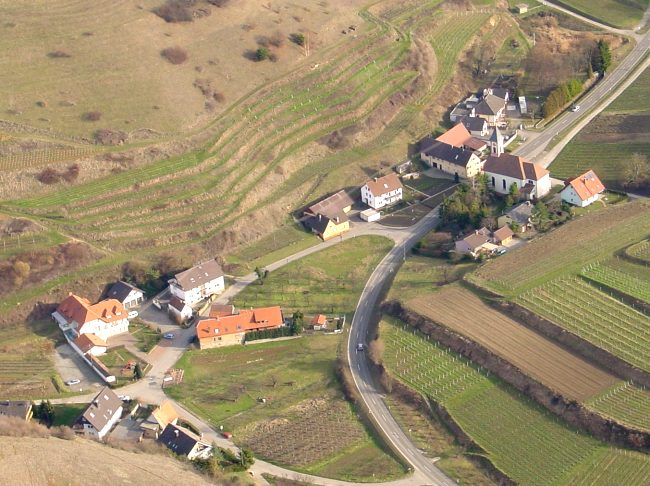
Alt-Vogtsburg (Old-Vogtsburg), politically part of Oberbergen

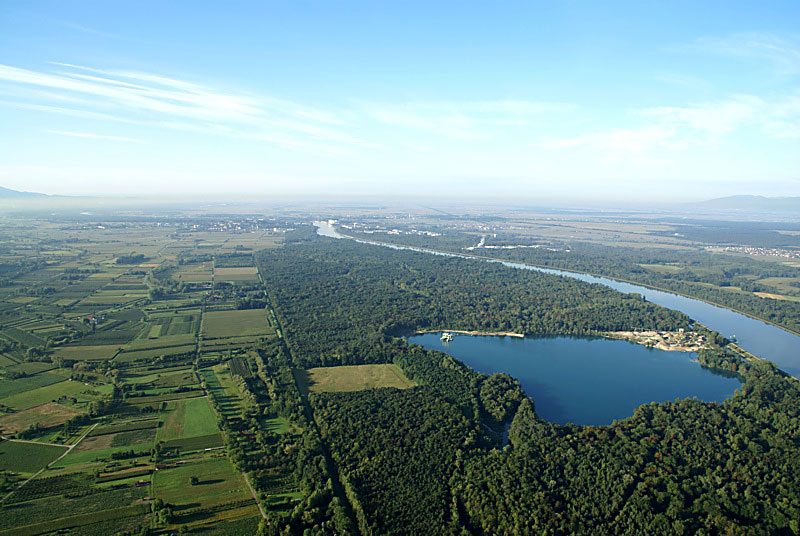
Quarry pond near Burkheim

== Policy ==
=== Municipal Council ===
The results of the local elections from June 13 of 2004:

FWG (Free Electors Association)	49,8%	+0,2	13 seats	±0
CDU (Christian Democratic Union)	38,0%	-2,9	9 seats	-1
SPD (Social Democratic Party of Germany)	12,3%	+2,9	3 seats	+1

== Economy and infrastructure ==
The city economy is based primarily on the production of wine grapes. In addition the production of cherries, zwetschgen, and apples contribute significantly to the economy. In recent years tourism has grown to be an important economic contributor.

=== Court ===
Vogtsburg is in the jurisdiction of the district court of Breisach.

=== Education ===
There is one general-education secondary school, two primary schools, and six kindergartens plus one nursery school. Nearby in Breisach there is a secondary school and a 'Gymnasium' (high school, grammar school).

=== Streets ===
The L113 - a country road without cross-town links runs through the western part of the city. This street goes from Breisach - Riegel to Freiamt, and then meets the L115 near Niederrotweil. The L115 goes on to Bötzingen and Umkirch. The different districts are connected with a net of district roads.

Vogtsburg is one of the rare towns without speed limit zones of 30 km/h (20 mph).

=== Public transport ===
Achkarren, Oberrotweil and Burkheim together with Bischoffingen each have a railway station for the western track of the small Kaiserstuhlbahn, a light railway leading from Breisach to Riegel. The railway traffic does not follow a fixed timetable but runs occasionally as needed. Vogtsburg is connected by bus lines to Breisach, Endingen, Bötzingen and Freiburg. All public transport is a part of a regional transport association.

=== Shipping ===
Even though Burkheim borders directly on the Rhine river, the city of Vogtsburg has no river harbor. There is a landing stage on the river to ship the grit produced by a quarry in Burkheim.

== Culture and objects of interest ==
=== Museums ===
In 1979 the museum of viniculture in the historical 'Zehntscheur' (a barn where historic taxes were collected = 1 tenth of all produced goods) was established in Achkarren. The earliest documented reference to this building dates from 1358 as 'St. Johannser Trotte'. In Burkheim one can visit the Museum of Corkscrews.

=== Buildings ===
In the villages of Achkarren, Oberrotweil, Schelingen and Altvogtsburg there are four churches designed by Friedrich Weinbrenner, a famous architect. These four churches are typical of the style of Neoclassicism in the former state of Baden.

The church of St. Michael's in Niederrotweil dates from 1157, according to documented references. This building is famous for some recently discovered frescoes and for its wooden altar, a late masterpiece of the unknown master H. L. This altar is an extraordinary example of the baroque style of gothic art and is dated to about 1530.

The church St. Romanus in Alt-Vogtsburg was founded in 1835/36 as a subsidiary church near a country road. First a church with a capacity of 700 people was planned which would have been several times the population figure of Alt-Vogtsburg. The reduced version built by the master builder Hans Voß has a choir and two adjoining rooms. The altar comes from the workshop of Franz Xaver Marmon. The windows are from the Freiburg glass workshops of Helmle and Merzweiler. The inner part of the church is decorated with historical paintings and murals from the Freiburg painter Anselm Endress. The church is now closed due to structural deterioration caused by water intrusion and vibration from traffic. The 'Deutsche Stiftung Denkmalschutz" (German Foundation for Monument Protection) is engaged in restoration of the church.

The old town of Burkheim starts with a historical town gate. Its houses are grouped around a single paved street, and look very romantic. At the end of the town an old ruin of a castle sits atop a small mountain, below which the Rhine used to flow.

High above the village of Achkarren on the top of the Schloßberg mountain are the ruins of the castle Burg Hoehingen.

=== Natural monuments ===
There are twelve nature reserves covering a total of 280 hectares (1.1 sq mi).

=== Sport ===
Cycling races: Vogtsburg is the site of the traditional last race (king's stage) of the 'International Rothaus Regio-Tour' (sponsored by a local beer brewers company).

== Sons and daughters of the town ==
- Eugen Biser (born 1918 in Oberbergen), a philosopher of religion
- Simone Larsen (born 1970), a German-Norwegian popstar, grew up in Bischoffingen
- Lazarus von Schwendi (1522–1584), a diplomat, statesman and an emperor's general, since 1560 AD Lord of Burkheim (Oberrotweil, Oberbergen, Vogtsburg and Jechtingen included).
- Jörg Wickram (* b. 1505 in Burkheim, d. 1562), an early New High German writer
