= Kaiserstuhl (Baden-Württemberg) =

Low mountain range in Germany

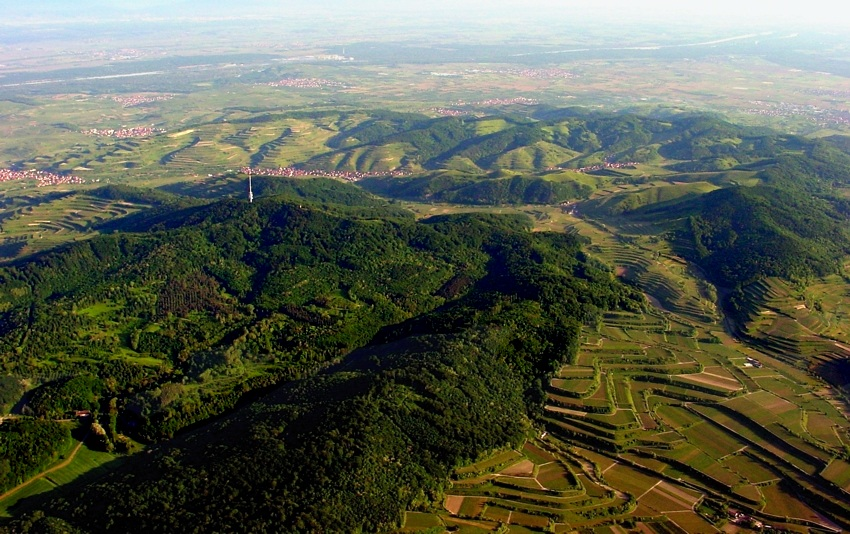
- The Kaiserstuhl hills including the Totenkopf with its transmission tower, the village of Oberbergen beyond it and the Rhine River in the background (aerial view looking north-northwest)

Highest point
- Peak: Totenkopf
- Elevation: 556.6 m above NHN

Geography
- Location within Baden-Württemberg
- State(s): Counties of Emmendingen and Breisgau-Hochschwarzwald; Baden-Württemberg, Germany
- Range coordinates: 48°04′51″N 7°40′14″E
- Parent range: Southern Upper Rhine Plain

Geology
- Orogeny: Volcanic range of the German Central Uplands

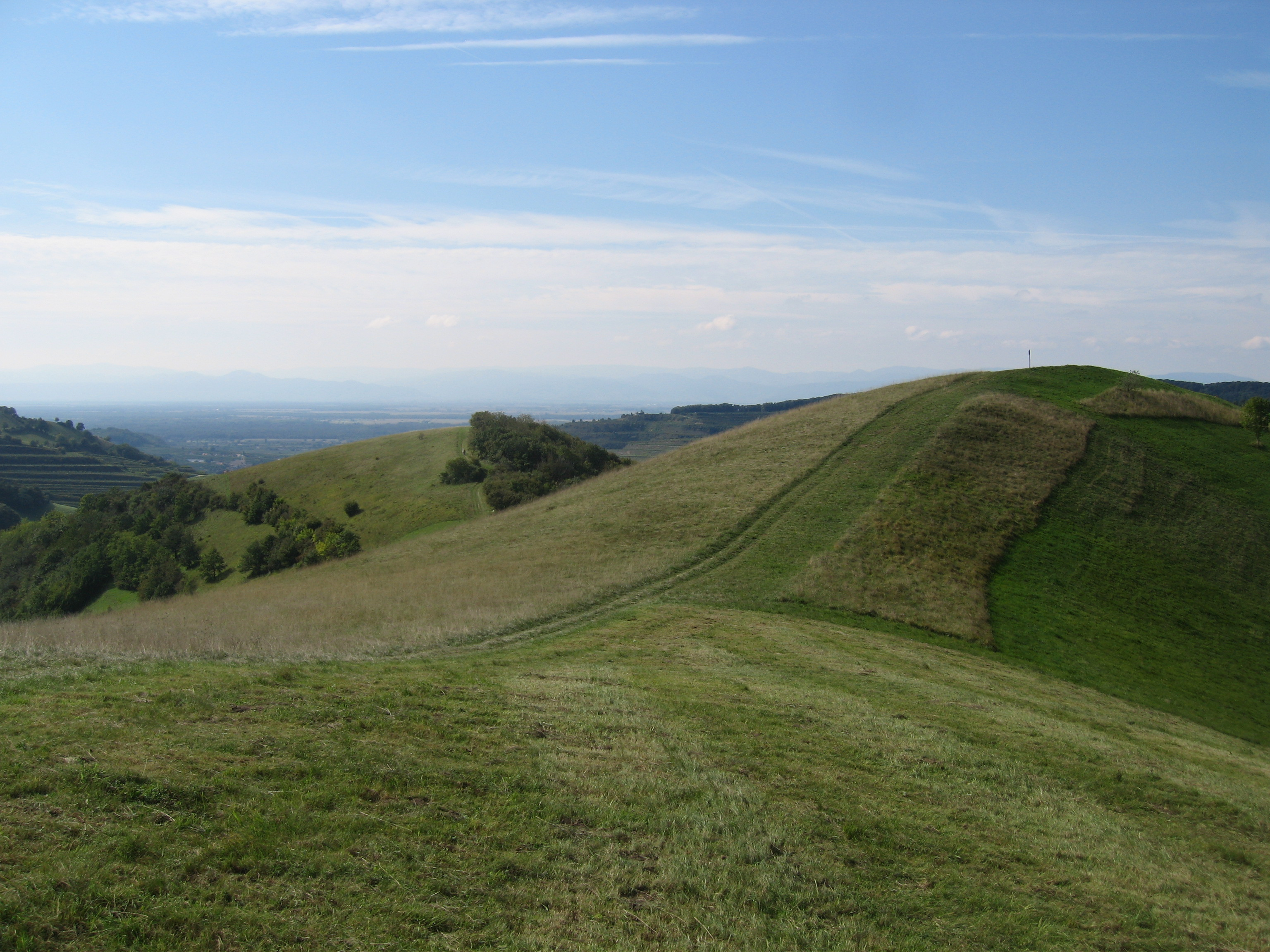
Badberg Nature Reserve, the Kaiserstuhl in late summer

The Kaiserstuhl (German: [ˈkaɪzɐʃtuːl], lit. "Emperor’s Chair") is a range of hills in the state of Baden-Württemberg in southwest Germany with a maximum height of 556.6 metres (1,826 ft). It is of volcanic origin and located in the southwest of the state in the counties of Emmendingen and Breisgau-Hochschwarzwald. In terms of natural regions it is considered to be a part of the Upper Rhine Plain.

== Name ==
The name "Kaiserstuhl" is believed to refer to King Otto III, who held court near Sasbach on 22 December 994. From then on, the whole hill range was called the Königsstuhl – the King's Chair. In May 996, Otto III was crowned Emperor and the King's Chair eventually became the Emperor's Chair – "Kaiserstuhl". Reliable sources mention the name Kaiserstuhl only as early as 1304 and historians thus suppose that the term Kaiserstuhl was not coined until the 13th century.

== Geography ==
=== Location ===
The Kaiserstuhl is situated in South Baden, mainly in Breisgau-Hochschwarzwald county or district. However, the smaller northern part belongs to Emmendingen. Within the Upper Rhine Plain it is situated about 16 km northwest of the city of Freiburg, right next to the eastern bank of the Rhine and a short distance west of the Dreisam. It reaches up to 377 metres above the level of the Rhine downstream (179.5 m a.s.l.) from the weir close to Burkheim.

At its greatest extent, from the Michaelsberg near Riegel in the northeast, to the Fohrenberg, by Ihringen in the southwest, the Kaiserstuhl is about 15 km long. Its maximum width is about 12.5 km.

=== Hills ===
The hills of the Kaiserstuhl include the following (sorted by height in metres above sea level):

- Totenkopf (556.6 m), 1.9 km east of Bickensohl; with the Vogtsburg 1 telecommunication tower and Neunlinden observation tower
- Eichelspitze (521.3 m), 2.8 km northwest of Bötzingen
- Katharinenberg (492.4 m), 1.3 km southeast of Amoltern
- Bisamberg (469.0 m), 1.2 km south of Amoltern
- Staffelberg (446.0 m), 1.5 km northwest of Schelingen
- Badberg (432.7 m) (protected area), 1.5 km east of Oberbergen
- Holzeck (431.9 m), 1.7 km northeast of Ihringen; with tower
- Hochbuck (374.8 m), 900 m south of Achkarren
- Schlossberg (352.1 m), 500 m northwest of Achkarren; with Höhingen Castle ruins
- Böselsberg (340.1 m), 500 m northwest of Wasenweiler
- Büchsenberg (283.7 m), 1.3 km west of Achkarren

== Towns and villages ==
Towns and villages in and around the Kaiserstuhl (in alphabetical order) are:

- Bahlingen
- Bötzingen
- Breisach
- Eichstetten
- Endingen with Amoltern, Kiechlinsbergen and Königschaffhausen
- Ihringen with Wasenweiler
- Riegel am Kaiserstuhl
- Sasbach with Jechtingen and Leiselheim
- Vogtsburg with Achkarren, Bickensohl, Bischoffingen, Burkheim, Oberbergen, Oberrotweil and Schelingen
- Wyhl

== Geology ==
The formation of the Kaiserstuhl volcano during the Tertiary was the climax and at the same time the end of volcanic activity in the Upper Rhine Valley Rift. Volcanism started as early as the Cretaceous Period. Volcanic landforms include heavily eroded volcanic vents. The Kaiserstuhl is the only larger volcano from this period in the rift valley. Geologically the Kaiserstuhl can be divided into two parts: the sedimentary and volcanic part. Due to these peculiarities the Kaiserstuhl has been labeled one of the most important national geotopes.

=== Sedimentary base ===
The horizontal sedimentary layers forming the eastern third of the Kaiserstuhl date back to the Jurassic and the Tertiary long before the volcanic activity. Important stratigraphic outcrops include the Hauptrogenstein (local oolite) which is found mainly near the village of Riegel and the Pechelbronner Schichten (local Tertiary layers in the South German Scarplands) near Bötzingen. During the formation of the Upper Rhine Plain this part of the Kaiserstuhl sloped less in respect to its surrounding area – and thus appears as a so-called horst. In terms of its geological structure and the sequence of its escarpments, the Kaiserstuhl is comparable to the nearby Tuniberg, Nimberg and also to the Schönberg, which is situated south of the city of Freiburg.

=== Volcanic activity ===
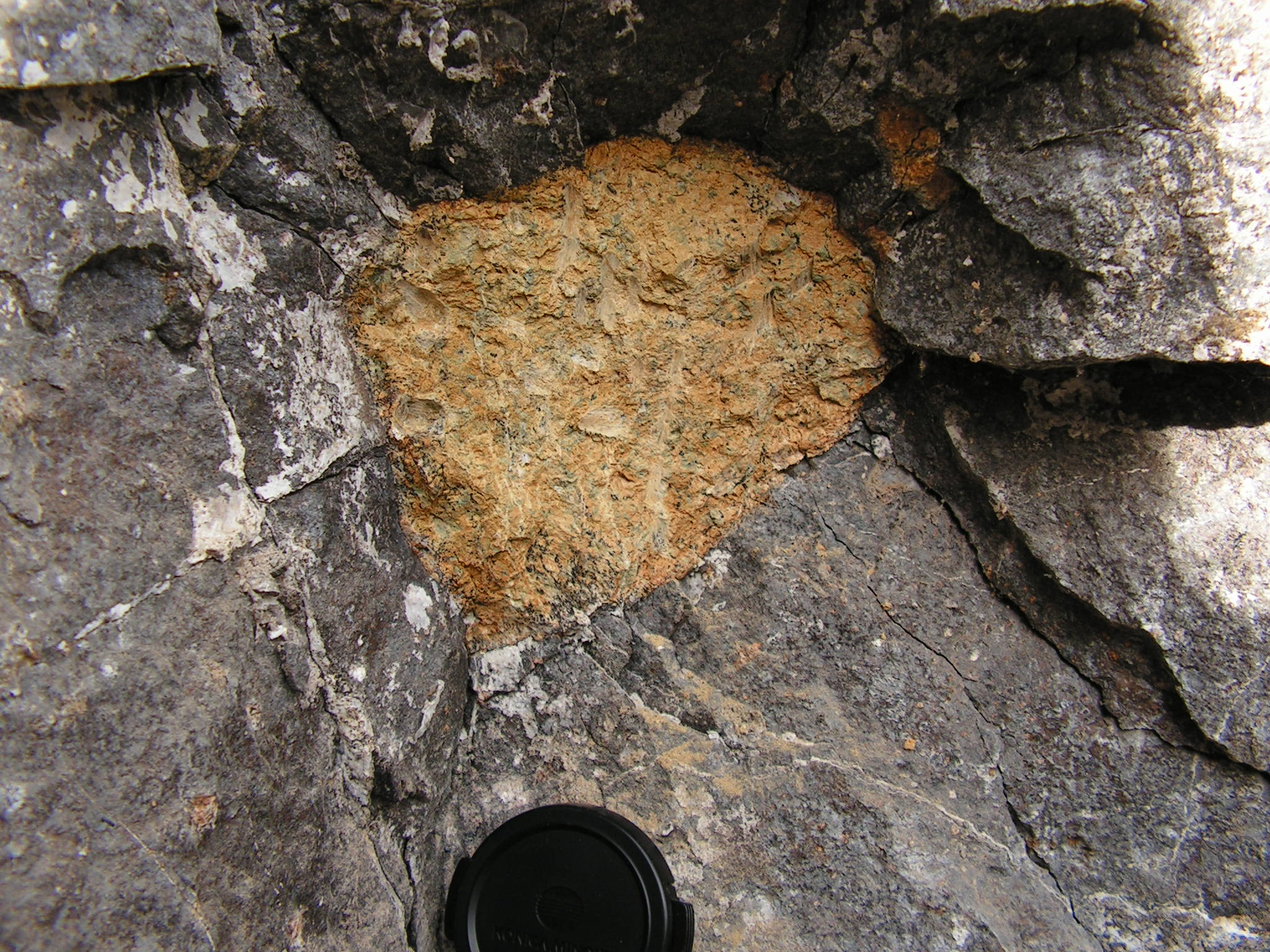
Peridotite xenolith in a nephelinite lava flow, Kaiserstuhl

Petrologically the volcanic Kaiserstuhl is an alkali-carbonate rock formation. The volcanic rocks making up a large part of the central and western Kaiserstuhl were the result of numerous volcanic eruptions during the Miocene, about 19 to 16 million years ago. They cover parts of the sedimentary base of the eastern Kaiserstuhl, which is why in some places changes in the base's mineralogical composition occurred. The driving force behind this process of contact metamorphism was an increase in temperature. Due to the alternate eruption of tephra and lava flows from several vents a complex stratovolcano came into existence. Some of the rising magma solidified as volcanic intrusions below the surface – and today forms the central part of the Kaiserstuhl. Laterally rising phonolite magma also intruded into the sedimentary base of the Eastern Kaiserstuhl. Several hundred metres of the original volcano have been eroded.

=== Volcanic rocks ===
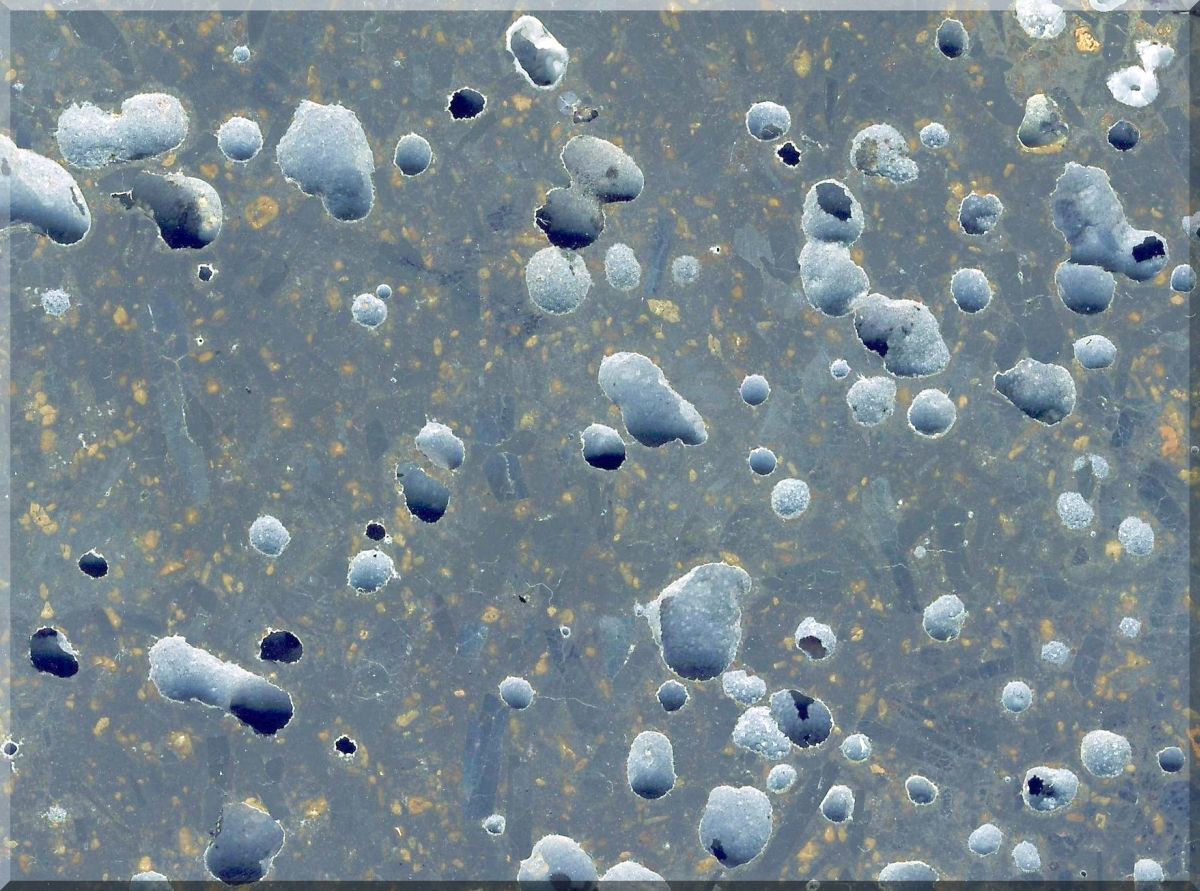
Polished limburgite, Kaiserstuhl

The entire volcanic Kaiserstuhl consists of rock types that contain feldspathoid minerals and olivine and are undersaturated with SiO_{2}. Most igneous rocks at the surface are leucite-tephrites, with subordinate phonolites, limburgites, and olivine-nephelinites (at the Limberg Mountain near Sasbach), the last of which is rich in xenoliths from the Earth's mantle. Carbonatite ignimbrite and lapilli are local peculiarities; they can be found in places in the western part of the Kaiserstuhl (Henkenberg near Burkheim, Kirchberg near Oberrotweil).

The subvolcanic and intrusive rocks of the central Kaiserstuhl are plutonic equivalents of the erupted material (essexite, carbonatite and coarse-granular phonolite). Several local terms which do not carry official status with the International Union of Geological Sciences have been used for different varieties of the intrusive rocks. Of major scientific interest is the consolidated carbonatite near Altvogtsburg und Schelingen. It is a quite rare volcanic rock, which crystallized from a carbonate magmatic melt rather than a silicate one. Given its unusual composition for an igneous rock, the magmatic nature of the carbonatite was not proposed for a long time and remained doubtful subsequently. An alternative interpretation was that it was a metamorphically altered sedimentary rock, examples of which can be found nearby. Only in the 1950s and 1960s did research prove that it was a carbonatite; one of the clues was identification of the eruptive carbonatites found in the western part of the Kaiserstuhl. The carbonatite contains the niobium rich pyrochlore; attempts to mine the carbonatite rock for niobium were carried out in the middle of the 20th century, but the amount turned out to be too small to be economical.

=== Minerals ===
For a long time the Kaiserstuhl has been known for rare minerals. Examples include the quarries at the Limberg (zeolites), Badberg (carbonatites), Orberg and Fohberg. Well-crystallized minerals can be found predominantly in clefts or cavities in the volcanic rock.

=== Loess ===
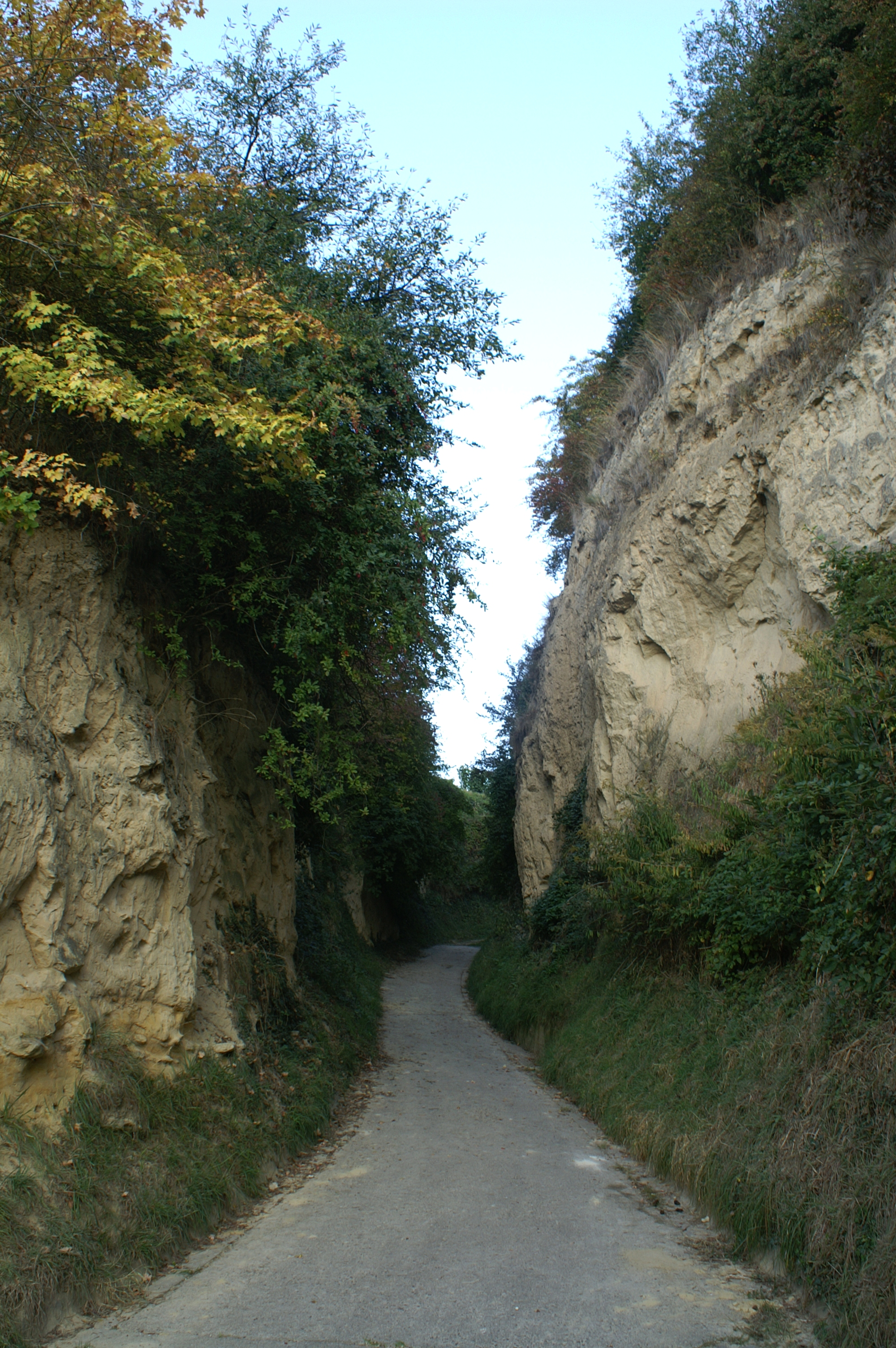
Loess alley near Vogtsburg-Bickensohl, Kaiserstuhl

The Kaiserstuhl is today largely covered by a Quaternary loess layer, a loosely cemented sediment. It is derived from other rocks through erosion and is then transported by the wind. The loess at the Kaiserstuhl – as in all the peripheral areas of the Upper Rhine Valley – was formed during the last Ice Age. Large parts were bare of vegetation and so loess was winnowed out from the Rhine sediments. It was then deposited in the periglacial area (i.e. ice-free, but surrounded by glaciers) at the Kaiserstuhl. The major process active here was frost weathering resulting in crushed rocks. The wind blew strongly, as there was no vegetation that could have moderated it – entraining the lightest material and depositing it at obstacles like the Kaiserstuhl. Deposition took place northeast of the Kaiserstuhl, as the winds blew from the southwest.

The higher the place of sedimentation, the thinner the layer of the sedimented material is. At the Kaiserstuhl the thickness of the loess layer varies between 10 and 40 metres. There are, however, also areas in the southwest where no loess has been deposited. The Northern Limestone Alps are considered the main source of the Kaiserstuhl loess. A rust-coloured band occurs at irregular intervals. It developed as a new material and did not arrive regularly but in phases of different intensities. In a phase of weak sedimentation the material on top weathered – and the calcium carbonate was washed out. It then precipitated further down and formed a particular type of soil horizon, which contains concretions of calcium carbonate.

The Kaiserstuhl loess soils are used for intensive farming, as they offer good aeration, high water storage capacities and good mechanical qualities. Besides, as a result of farming deep narrow ravine-like paths developed.

As the loess developed over time it is, furthermore, significant for flood control. Sponge-like, it absorbs and then gently releases rainfall. This quality is however lost when bulldozers, employed to construct large terraces for viticulture, compress the loess.

== Climate ==
=== General ===
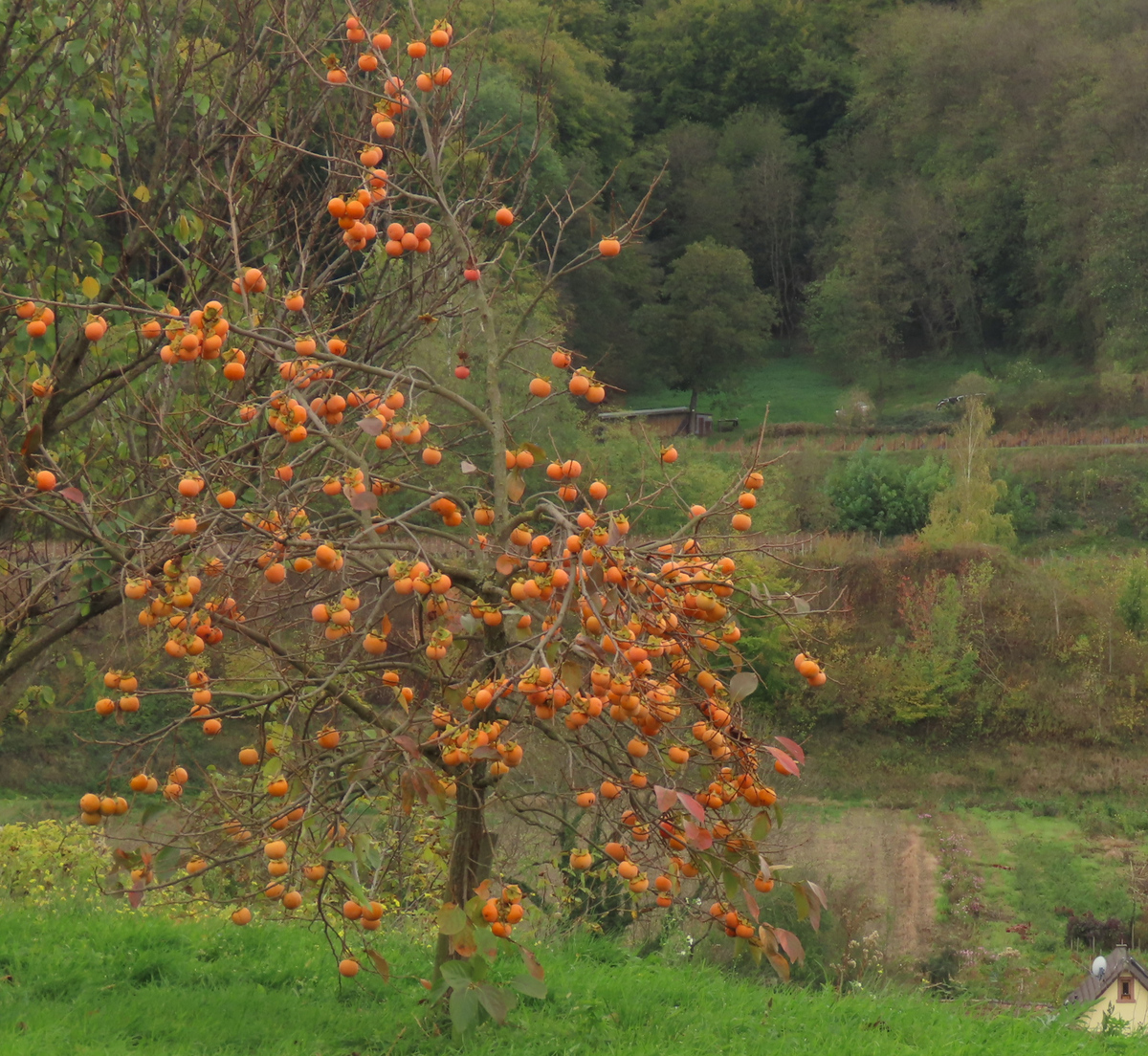
Exotic fruits like kakis can be grown in the region's warm climate

The Kaiserstuhl is one of the warmest regions in Germany. The climate in the area is a continentalized form of the mediterranean climate (Köppen climate classification: Csa). This is unique at 48° north latitude. Its location in the southwestern corner of Germany and the protection of the mountains give it a warm microclimate, which is influenced mostly by air from the western Mediterranean Sea blowing through the Burgundian Gate. Atlantic air masses can raise the temperatures especially in winter as well, while the surrounding mountains are able to hold most of the precipitation away from Kaiserstuhl. This is why the Region features nearly 2,100 sunshine hours and only around 500 milliliters of precipitation a year, while the nearby Black Forest has levels up to 2,000 milliliters a year.

Winters are short and mild, although light night frost can occur especially in January. Days are mostly cool to mild with changeable weather and, in the recent years, with a tendency to more precipitation during this period. Snow is very rare and concentrates mostly on the higher regions if it occurs.

Spring starts generally in February and is characterized by the almond flowering trees, which are typical for the region. The time between February and May counts many days exceeding 20 °C (68 °F) and therefore counts as one of the warmest and sunniest spring climates in the country.

Summers (June to September) can be very hot and with temperatures often exceeding the 35 °C (95 °F) during midsummer. Because of its loess covered volcanic soils and the climatic situation, it is an internationally renowned wine-producing region. In recent decades, there has been a tendency to very low precipitation during the summer months.

Autumn starts warm to still hot in September and cools down to around 10–12 °C (50–54 °F) by November on average. As the rest of the year, the southern location and direct Mediterranean influence can make autumns warm and pleasant with temperatures up to 30 °C (86 °F) even in the second half of October, which is very rare in other parts of Germany.

Besides the wine, the mild climate enables the wild cultivation of other sensitive fruits and vegetables like kaki, olive trees, fig trees, and banana plants. The region is also known for its wild growing cactus on old lava stones in the slopes of the Kaiserstuhl.

Climate data for Ihringen (Emmendingen 2010-2020)
Month	Jan	Feb	Mar	Apr	May	Jun	Jul	Aug	Sep	Oct	Nov	Dec	Year
Mean daily maximum °C (°F)	7.5 (45.5)	10.5 (50.9)	14.3 (57.7)	19.4 (66.9)	22.7 (72.9)	26.0 (78.8)	29.4 (84.9)	28.6 (83.5)	23.2 (73.8)	18.5 (65.3)	12.3 (54.1)	8.9 (48.0)	18.4 (65.1)
Mean daily minimum °C (°F)	1.7 (35.1)	2.5 (36.5)	6.0 (42.8)	9.1 (48.4)	13.4 (56.1)	16.4 (61.5)	18.2 (64.8)	18.0 (64.4)	13.1 (55.6)	10.2 (50.4)	5.1 (41.2)	2.9 (37.2)	9.7 (49.5)
Average precipitation mm (inches)	49 (1.91)	49 (1.94)	36 (1.41)	23 (0.89)	55 (2.18)	48 (1.89)	21 (0.82)	38 (1.51)	36 (1.41)	58 (2.3)	66 (2.6)	66 (2.6)	523 (20.59)
Mean monthly sunshine hours	57.3	116.2	164.0	251.2	247.9	268.1	286.1	248.9	199.1	115.0	59.0	53.4	2,066.2
Source: weather-online

== Flora and fauna ==
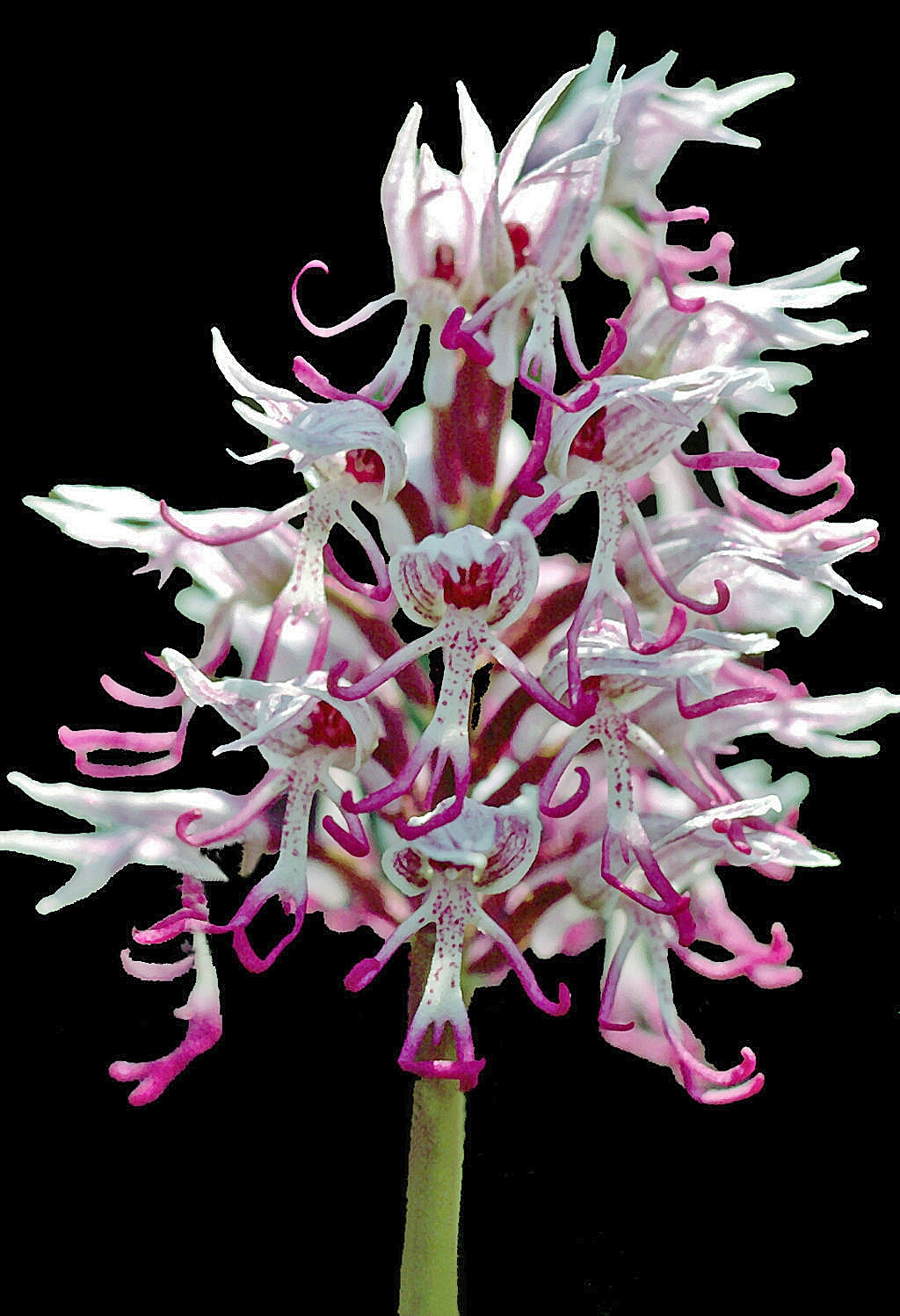
Orchis simia

The climate of the Kaiserstuhl also explains the vast richness of thermophile flora and fauna. The Kaiserstuhl is for example one of the places with the largest variety of orchids in Europe – more than 30 species have been recorded. Among the vines wild grape hyacinths sprawl and along acclivities iris plants blossom. Furthermore, sand lizards (lacerta bilineata) and praying mantis (Mantis religiosa) live here – species which mainly occur in the Mediterranean area. (However, according to the latest research results the sand lizard presumably belongs to the allochthonous species of the European green lizard (Lacerta viridis)). The pubescent oak (Quercus pubescens) is a Xerophyte and normally only occurs in Southern Europe, but is also able to survive at the Kaiserstuhl. This species has a disjunct distribution, which means away from its normal habitat. It is a relict of a postglacial warm period where there had been a much warmer climate around the Kaiserstuhl. After the end of the warm period only the named species were able to survive. Besides there is a larger population of the May beetle (Melolontha melolontha). In spite of protests from conservationists the May Beetle is controlled by the use of insecticides.

== Conservation area ==
In the centre of the Kaiserstuhl between the Vogt Burger districts of Schelingen and Oberbergen and the somewhat remote eastern community of Eichstetten lies two direct neighbouring natural Designated Conservation Areas (DCA), the DCA Badberg (DCA No. 81345), which was established in 1969, is 65 hectares high and has many rare plants (e.g. Orchids), and the eastern add-on DCA Haselschacher Buck (DCA no. 163542) which was founded in 1989 and is 71.3 hectares in size. Furthermore, in Kaiserstuhl there is a large number of small Designated Conservation Areas. The bigger part, in particular in its centre belongs to the Fauna Flora Habitat area of the Kaiserstuhl (FFH no. 7911–341).

== Economy ==
The Kaiserstuhl and its surrounding area is a region of intense wine growing. Wines from the Kaiserstuhl have achieved an excellent reputation which has by now become international. The bigger part of the available area is covered with vineyards. They are either run as parts of winemaking cooperatives or are private property or property of private vineries. Because of the volcanic soils, vines grow particularly well.

Varietals grown in the Kaiserstuhl: Müller-Thurgau, Riesling, Silvaner, Ruländer, Blue Spätburgunder, Grauburgunder, Weißer Burgunder, Gewürztraminer.

== Changes in landscape ==
The terrain of the Kaiserstuhl has been altered by the people living there since it was settled. The loam there is strongly susceptible to erosion as a result of soil cultivation, thus terraces had to be added, which were then mostly used as vineyards, as well as fruit growing or for other agricultural uses. As a result, the typical small "patio" hillsides and the streaked loess sunken roads typical of the region came into being.

To start with, it was for this reason that smaller terraces were merged in around 1950, this resulted in large scale reallocation, which turned parts of the original landscape completely upside down.

The phases of this reallocation were:-

- Small-scale realignment between 1950 and 1960. At the same time the terrain was generally modified by manual labour with the help of in-house machines. During this time approximately 950 hectares were enclosed by the farmland consolidation authority.
- Between 1960 and 1970 the loess slopes were more comprehensively modified, whereby large rectangular terraced areas with corresponding high embankments were made. The terraces were arranged with mountain like slopes so that now only the multiple slope edges are visible from the valley. About 650 hectares of the surface were styled in this way.
- The plans to create large-scale terraces made between 1970 and 1976 were executed with the help of heavy machinery, changing the landscape radically. Before the original, naturally formed, depressions had still been visible in the gentle hillsides with only small terraces. Natural and man-made structures existed side by side. However, these small-scale structures were then obliterated completely. Monstrous areas resembling fortresses and entirely incongruous to the region were created. The total wine-growing area of the terraces was 630 ha. As the embankments and other areas exceeded the size of the wine-growing areas, the changes affected more than twice the newly created arable area. The land reforms of Oberrotweil-Oberberg, Ihringen-Abtsweingarten, Eichstetten-Hättlinsberg and Endingen am Kaiserstuhl-Schambach are examples of this phase.
- The last phase of wine-growing land reforms was realized between 1976 and 1982. Due, in part, to protests against plans for further large scale terraces the changes were not as radical as the previous phase: the maximum height for embankments was "limited" to 10 m and their shapes were "made smooth and adjusted to the landscape" (Mayer 1986, citation translated). This procedure was, for example, applied to about 330 ha of wine-growing area in Oberbergen-Baßgeige or in Bickensohl-Herrenstück.

From 1977 on, several longer periods of enhanced precipitation caused damage to the embankments. During one week in May 1983 for example, the amount of precipitation was so large that in some areas it was equivalent to one third of the annual average, causing great damage in the modified areas.

The surfaces of the acclivities often slid off together with the vegetation. Former valleys, which had been blocked due to re-allocation, were flushed out. In some terraces dramatic shear failures developed. In addition extensive, devastating frost damage occurred; due to the incline of the mountainside at the surfaces of the acclivities, cold air pockets were formed in which the vines in bloom were frostbitten. Additionally substantial frost damage occurred in the woody part of the vines, especially in the vineyards which were situated in lower regions. In earlier times fruit had mostly been grown here but later this was changed to vineyards.

The activity of the farmland consolidation authority was narrowed to repairing and partly to rescheduling which at least was meant to correct the most severe consequences of the transformations from 1982 on.

== Transport links ==
The Kaiserstuhl area is served by the A 5 motorway. Major local roads are the L 113 that links the A5, the north side of the area and the French border; and the B 31 which connects the southside of the area with the French border, A 5 and Freiburg i.B. The area is also served by Breisgau S-Bahn. The Kaiserstuhl Railway runs past the range to the east, north and west, whilst the Breisach Railway passes it to the south.

== Hiking ==
There are many opportunities for hiking in the Kaiserstuhl. The best known trail is the North-South Trail (check mark: blue rhomb on yellow background) from Endingen across the Katharinenberg and the Totenkopf and the Neunlinden viewing point to Ihringen. From the trail there are panoramic views over the Black Forest, the Upper Rhine Valley and the Vosges.

In 2007, eight trails were opened, each with a special theme. They have a total length of 140 km and were integrated into the existing trail network (check mark: yellow rhomb on white background) of the Black Forest Club. In doing so, the network was provided with 430 new signposts. Large information boards with an overview map and site information are placed at central points, for example in railway stations, which the trails link to, or through built up areas. Every trail is distinguished by its own colour and the names have a corresponding symbol displayed on entranceways and signposts. A further 120 smaller themed paths illuminate local attractions along the way. Local paths such as the Brunnenpfad (7 km) in Bötzingen were integrated into the new network of themed paths.

- Neunlindenpfad (North-south trail): Ihringen-Endingen, 16,8 km.
- Steinkauzpfad: Wasenweiler-Riegel, 17,9 km.
- Wiedehopfpfad: Breisach-Sachbach/Limberg, 31,5 km.
- Knabenkrautpfad: Breisach-Bötzingen, 21,5 km.
- Kirschbaumpfad: Sasbach-Riegel, 18,4 km.
- Katharinenpfad: Vogtsburg-Oberrotweil-Bahlingen, 12,6 km.
- Badbergpfad: Vogtsburg-Oberrotweil-Nimburg, 14,9 km.
- Bienenfresserpfad: Ihringen-Königschaffhausen, 16,1 km.

In 2010, the Kaiserstuhlpfad was added to the eight theme trails. This trail was given a special status as a "Quality Trail of Wonderful Germany" (Qualitätswanderweg Wunderbares Deutschland). The trail, which has a length of 21.7 km, was adapted to the Neunlindenpfad (North-South Trail) and leads from Endingen through the Ehrle Valley to St. Catherine's Chapel (Katharinenkapelle), across the Badberge hills to the Eichelspitz Tower, onward across the Vogelsang Pass to the Neunlinden Tower, through the Eichgasse to Bickensohl and across the Kreuzbuck through the Lenzengasse to Ihringen.

== See also ==
- Hegau
