= Üsenberg Castle =

Castle ruins in Baden-Württemberg, Germany

- Üsenberg; Near Breisach in Germany

Site information
- Type: hill castle, Burgstall
- Owner: lords of Üsenberg

Location
- Coordinates: 48°02′33.9″N 7°34′28.7″E

Site history
- Built: 11th century
- Built by: lords of Üsenberg

The Üsenberg Castle (German: Burg Üsenberg; Alemannic German: Burg Isebärg) was a ruined hill castle near the city of Breisach in the Breisgau-Hochschwarzwald district of Baden-Württemberg, Germany.

== History ==
The castle was built in the 11th century as the family seat of the lords of Üsenberg. It was located just north of the emerging town of Breisach. The information about its destruction are unclear and contradictory. The castle was possibly destroyed by the inhabitants of Breisach in the 1240s. As a replacement, the lords of Üsenberg obtained the Höhingen Castle near Achkarren. In 1291, the Üsenberg Castle was considered a Burgstall. In 1320, the lords of Üsenberg sold the lot of the former castle to the city inhabitants.

There are no remains of the former castle.

== Bibliography ==
- Zettler, Alfons; Zotz, Thomas (2003). Die Burgen im mittelalterlichen Breisgau, I. Nördlicher Teil: Halbband A-K (in German). Ostfildern: Jan Thorbecke Verlag. pp. 54–56. ISBN 3-7995-7364-X.
- Kraus, Franz Xaver (1904). "Erste Abtheilung – Kreis Freiburg". Die Kunstdenkmäler des Großherzogthums Baden (in German). Vol. 6. Tübingen and Leipzig. pp. 3–4.
- Kiewat, Rainer (2006). Die Burgen der Üsenberger: Kirnburg, Burg Üsenberg, Burg Riegel, Burg Höhingen (in German). Kenzingen.
