= Sasbach =

Sasbach may refer to two towns in Baden-Württemberg, Germany:

- Sasbach (Ortenau), in the Ortenau district
- Sasbach am Kaiserstuhl, in the district of Emmendingen
