= Achkarren =

- Ortsteil of Vogtsburg
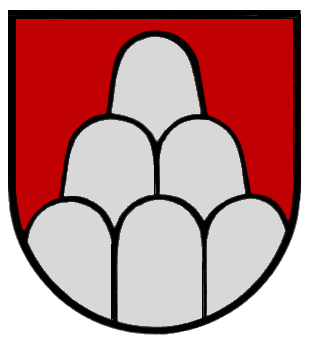
- Coat of arms

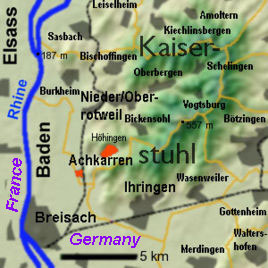
- Location of Achkarren in the Kaiserstuhl. The town and the small industrial park are marked red.
- Interactive map of Achkarren
- Location within Germany Location within Baden-Württemberg
- Coordinates: 48°4′4″N 7°37′37″E
- Country: Germany
- State: Baden-Württemberg
- Admin. region: Freiburg
- District: Breisgau-Hochschwarzwald
- Town: Vogtsburg

Area
  - Total: 3.53 km^{2} (1.36 sq mi)
- Elevation: 180–360 m (590–1,180 ft)

Population (2006-12-31)
  - Total: 823
  - Density: 233/km^{2} (604/sq mi)
- Time zone: UTC+01:00 (CET)
  - Summer (DST): UTC+02:00 (CEST)
- Postal codes: 79235
- Dialling codes: 07662

Achkarren, a village situated in the southern end of the small town of Vogtsburg im Kaiserstuhl, in the German Kaiserstuhl region, bordering the town of Ihringen. The valley of Achkarren faces west and is 5 km from the Rhine river and 7 km from Breisach. The highest average temperature or hotspot in Germany is located between the center of Achkarren and the town of Ihringen.

== History ==
The first documented reference to Achkarren appears in 1064 AD when the village was given to the cloister of Ottmarsheim (a small Town in Alsace) by King Heinrich IV. Based on archeological artifacts, the village could have been settled as early as two thousand years ago. The omnipresent wine terraces may have been established during the settlement by the Alemanni from 260 AD on. The name "Achkarren" is derived from the Old High German "haz karle" (Hate Charles), reportedly the name of an early settler from the neighboring village of Oberrotweil.

Town folk tell a tale of the origin of the village name:
During the construction of the castle Hoehingen on Schlossberg (Castle Mountain), high above the village, an accident occurred. A cart full of building material was pushed up the mountain several times. Every time the cart was close to the summit, it broke loose and rolled back down into the valley. While watching this unfortunate spectacle, the future Lord of the castle shouted "Ach Karren!" (Oh Cart!).

In 1525, the castle was severely damaged during the German Peasants' War. After rebuilding, its complete destruction occurred during the Thirty Years' War. The Kaiser's Catholic troops destroyed it once they could not hold back the attack from the Swedes. Today artifacts of the ruins can still be found. Three years after the Thirty Years War ceased, a total of 58 residents remained in the village; approximately 70% of the population perished during the war. In 1703 AD, during the siege of Breisach by French troops, the village itself was completely destroyed. This siege was part of the War of the Spanish Succession. In the chaos of wars between the late medieval and modern times, Achkarren as well as its neighboring towns of Ihringen and Breisach were several times part of France, and remained so for some years.

A quarry is located between Schlossberg Mountain and Buechsenberg Mountain. For the construction of the St. Stephansmuenster (cathedral) in Breisach, material from this quarry was used. Recently the quarry was revived in order to further repair the cathedral.

== Miscellaneous ==
The vineyards of Achkarren are considered some of the best in Germany. In particular, the local Ruländer or Grauburgunder (Pinot grigio) is famous. The Vintners Cooperative Society of Achkarren and the village wineries have received many prizes for the quality of their wines. In addition to loess, Achkarren contains over 50% volcanic soil.

There are several trails on Schlossberg as well as Schneckenberg (Snail Mountain). On these trails one can view the layers of volcanic rock covered with a thin top layer of loess.

Achkarren's Buechsenberg Nature Preserve contains a collection of rare plants and wildlife. Appropriately, Achkarren has a Winemaking Museum and boasts a 2.4 km long trail that features the geology of winemaking, its soil, climate, grape variety and the history of winemaking of the Kaisersuhl.

In addition to wine making, tourism and a small industrial park in the Rhine Rift are the main businesses of the village.

== Gallery ==
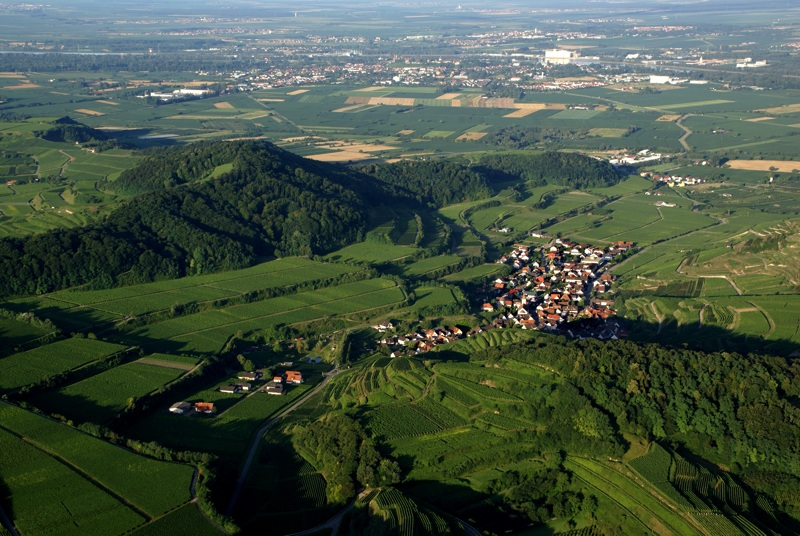
Aerial view of Achkarren from the east with Breisach in the background.

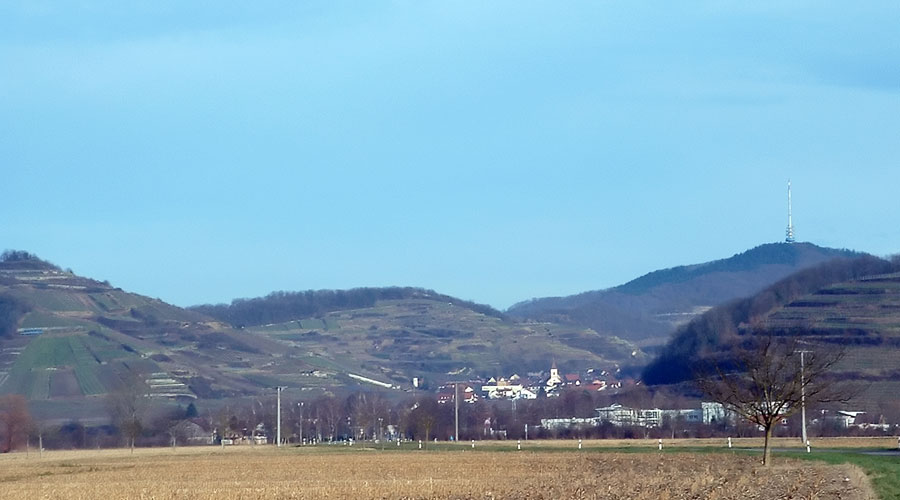
Achkarren viewed from the West (Rhine Rift). Left to right: Summit of the Schlossberg, Schneckenberg and Totenkopf (Death Head) with its transmission tower (highest elevation of the Kaisertuhl)

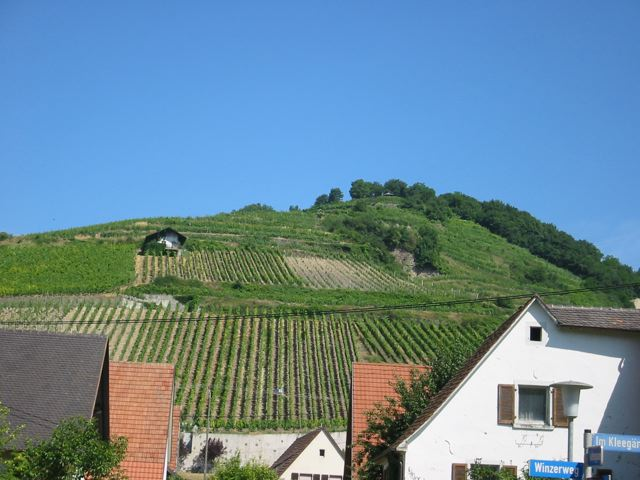
Schlossberg mountain seen from the valley. Difference in elevation is about 150 m (500 ft). The steepest vineyards are bringing the best wines.

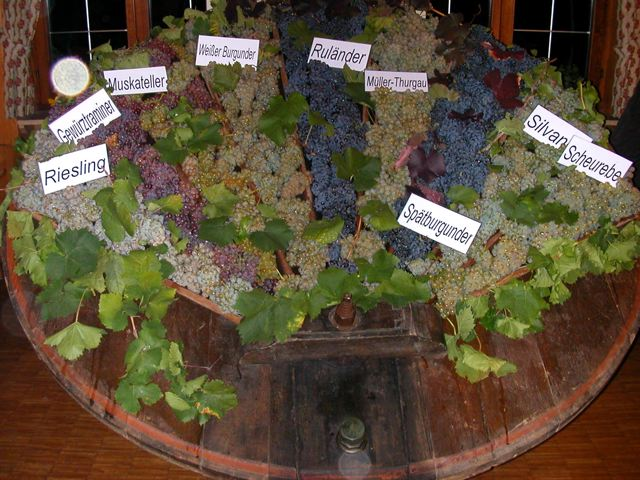
Overview of the grape variety. Left to right: Riesling, Gewürztraminer, Muskateller, Weisser Burgunder, Ruländer, Müller-Thurgau, Spätburgunder, Silvaner and Scheurebe

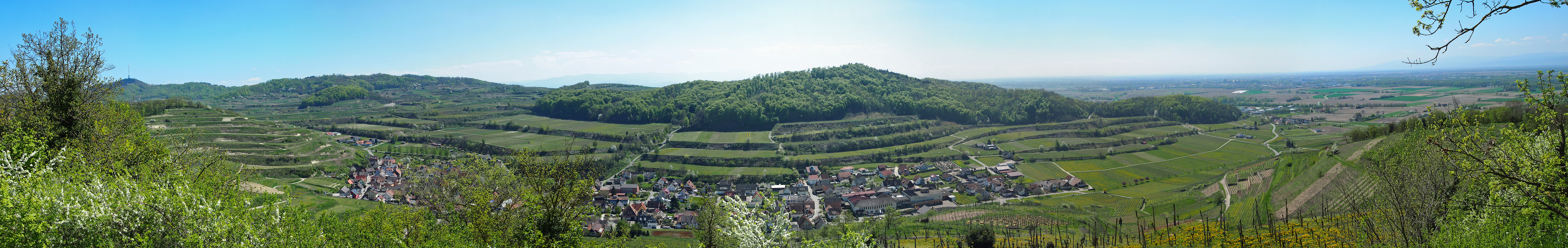
Panorama view of the village (shot in the spring). View from the top of the Schlossberg. Very high resolution - click to view.
