= Höhingen Castle =

Höhingen Castle (Burg Hoehingen)
- South-western Germany

Site information
- Type: Castle
- Condition: Ruine

Location
- Coordinates: 48°4′15″N 7°37′15″E

Site history
- Built: before 1064 AD, documented reference 1259 AD
- Materials: Stone
- Demolished: 1633

Höhingen Castle (German: Burg Hoehingen) is a castle built in the Early Middle Ages on the top of the Schlossberg, a hill, above the town Achkarren, a part of the city of Vogtsburg im Kaiserstuhl in the district Breisgau-Hochschwarzwald in Baden-Württemberg in Germany.

== Location ==
The castle is located on the top of the Schlossberg (354-metre (1,161 ft) above sea level) in the Rhine rift in the neighbourhood of Breisach. The height difference between the town in the valley and the former castle is about 150 m (460 ft). Hoehingen was an important castle for centuries. The distance to the strategically important and hard-fought fortification Breisach was just about 7 km (4.5 mi). The reason for the strategic importance lies in the topographic situation which allows only two narrow passages for north–south routes of commerce on the right side of the Rhine. One route goes between Riegel and the Black Forest and the other one between Breisach and Achkarren. Besides this, the Burg Höhingen played a counterpart to the more important Breisach during the changing history that was punctuated by war - particularly in the times of the Thirty Years' War.

== History ==
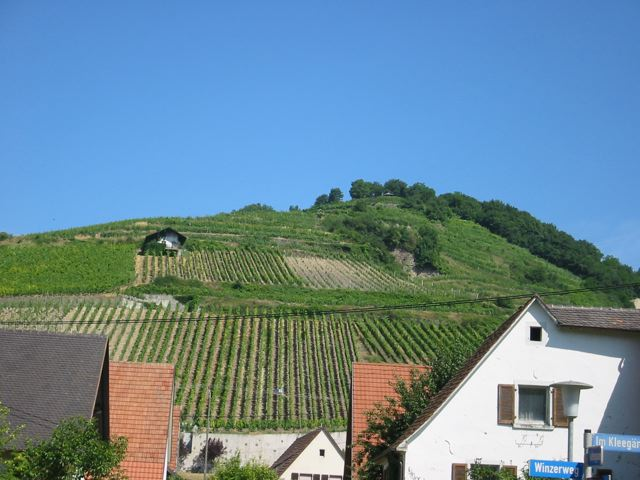
The Schlossberg seen from the town of Achkarren.

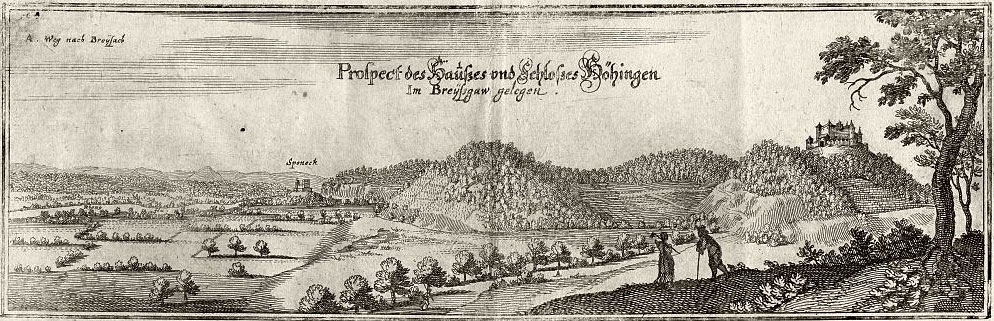
Engraving by Matthäus Merian from 1644 AD seen from the west (Rhine Rift).

Only little is known about the beginnings of the first castle buildings on the top of the Schloßberg. But there are references of first castle buildings in the year 1064 AD when the town Achkarren was mentioned first time in documents on the occasion of the giving of the village to the cloister of Ottmarsheim (a small Town in Alsace) by King Henry IV. In the following centuries the buildings have been extended several times. The first documented reference of the castle dates from the year 1259 AD. After surviving for centuries, the castle was burned down in 1525 AD during the German Peasants' War with participation of the peasants of Achkarren.

In 1620 AD, the castle was extended into a strong defensive fortification because the Schlossberg gave excellent views of the war events in the Rhine valley and the fortification of Breisach. In a contemporary report from Breisach's mayor to the imperial governor of the lands of Further Austria in Waldshut the castle is described as follows:

"The location (of the castle) is excellent, because it stands atop a hill and stands on hard rock, which is hard to access because of its steepness and therefore cannot be commanded by any nearby town. The building is constructed of heavy stonework, surrounded on one side by a deep trench and an unaccessible praecipitium (=sheer) on the other side, which was used as a quarry. The castle possesses a good cistern."

In 1633 AD, the castle was attacked from Breisach. The Catholic troops of the emperor succeeded in conquering and plundering the castle which had been occupied by the Swedes who were supported by the Protestant inhabitants of Ihringen. According to reports, the booty included, amongst other things, about 15,000 litres of wine. The property of the inhabitants of Ihringen, which was stored in the castle, was totally lost. Reports tell of a loss of 200 horses and about 300 head of cattle, which gives an indication of the size of the castle. After several serious disputes the castle finally was burned down by the emperor's occupying forces when they lost the ability to hold the castle. Because from 1671 AD on it was officially allowed to use the stones of the resulting ruins for the fortifications in Breisach and later for private houses, today only poor relics of the ruins can be seen.

== Appearance ==
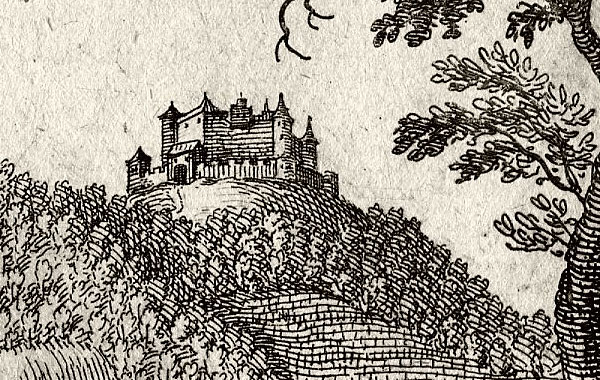
Detail of the castle from the engraving by Matthäus Merian

An impression of the possible appearance of the castle from an engraving by Matthäus Merian from 1644. Little is known about the realism of this picture. What can be said is that the entrance of the castle must have been exactly at the place the engraving indicates. The entrance can still be seen.
