= Totenkopf (hill) =

Natural feature in Germany

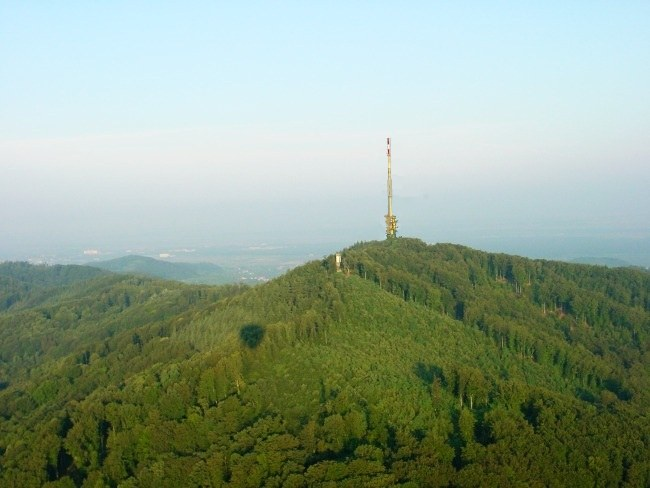
- Totenkopf with communications tower visible

Highest point
- Elevation: 557 m (1,827 ft)
- Coordinates: 48°04′51″N 7°40′14″E

Naming
- English translation: Skull
- Language of name: German

Geography
- Location within Baden-Württemberg
- Location: Baden-Württemberg, Germany
- Parent range: Kaiserstuhl

The Totenkopf is a hill in Baden-Württemberg, Germany, forming the highest point in the Kaiserstuhl region. The hill is topped by an observation tower and a 120-m (394-ft) Deutsche Telekom communications tower. Wine and fruit are cultivated on its slopes.

== Etymology ==
The name of the hill Totenkopf, meaning skull, dates back to the Middle Ages, at which time skulls were frequently to be found upon it, since the German King Otto III, (who would later be crowned Holy Roman Emperor Otto III) chose this hill to be the place of execution for those condemned to death at the hearings conducted at nearby Sasbach am Kaiserstuhl, those so condemned suffering death by decapitation according to the judgement of the king.
