= Eichstetten am Kaiserstuhl =

Human settlement in Germany

- Municipality
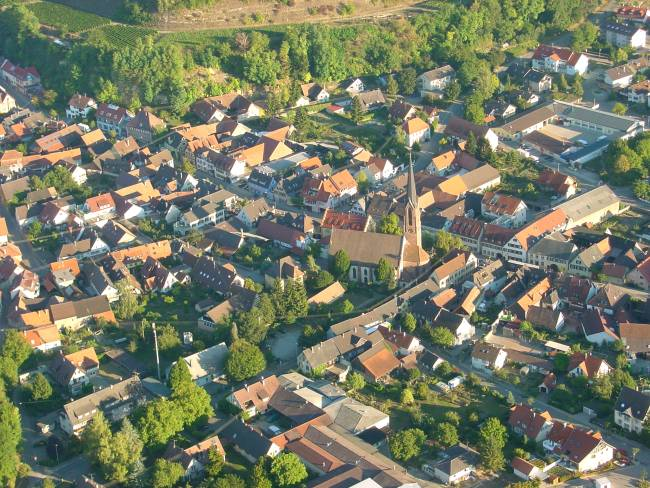
- Aerial view

- Coat of arms

- Location of Eichstetten am Kaiserstuhl within Breisgau-Hochschwarzwald district
- Interactive map of Eichstetten am Kaiserstuhl
- Location within Germany Location within Baden-Württemberg
- Coordinates: 48°05′39″N 07°44′40″E
- Country: Germany
- State: Baden-Württemberg
- Admin. region: Freiburg
- District: Breisgau-Hochschwarzwald

Government
  - Mayor (2021–29): Michael Bruder (CDU)

Area
  - Total: 12.3 km^{2} (4.7 sq mi)
- Elevation: 193 m (633 ft)

Population (2025-12-31)
  - Total: 3,757
  - Density: 305/km^{2} (791/sq mi)
- Time zone: UTC+01:00 (CET)
  - Summer (DST): UTC+02:00 (CEST)
- Postal codes: 79356
- Dialling codes: 07663
- Vehicle registration: FR
- Website: www.eichstetten.de

Eichstetten am Kaiserstuhl (German pronunciation: [ˈaɪ̯çʃtɛtn̩ ʔam ˈkaɪzɐʃtuːl], lit. 'Eichstetten on the Kaiserstuhl') is a municipality in the southwest of Baden-Württemberg in Germany near Freiburg im Breisgau.

== Geography ==
Eichstetten is a village in South Baden that produces wine. It is located in the Upper Rhine Plain on the eastern edge of the Kaiserstuhl. It is found in the warmest area of Germany embedded in a valley, which spreads from the wooded Eichelspitze (the second highest hill in the Kaiserstuhl) through sunny vineyards and vegetable fields right down to the lowland. The Alte Dreisam River flows through the town on the edge of the Kaiserstuhl.

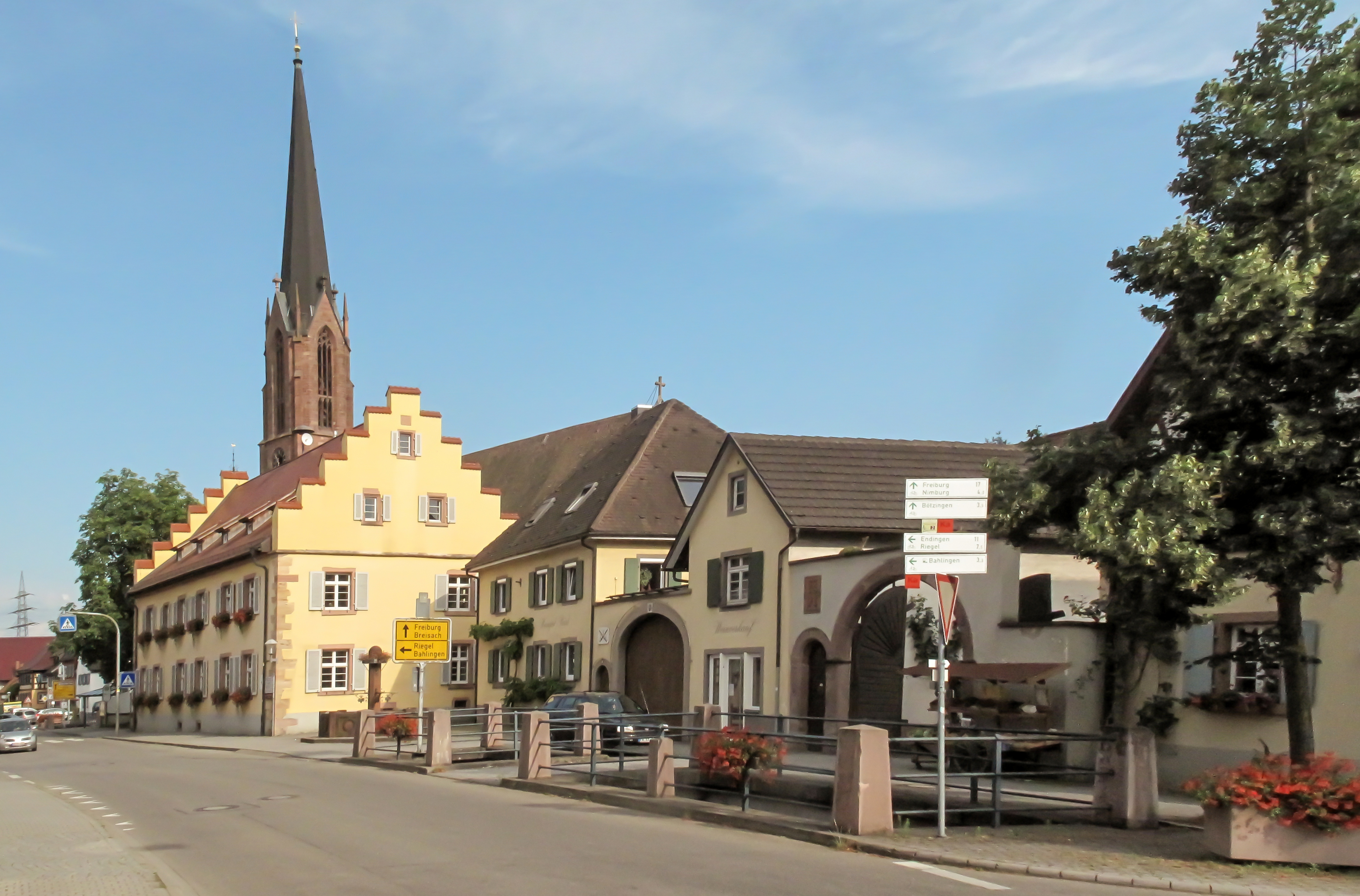
Eichstetten, reformed church in the street

As the crow flies, Eichstetten is located about 3.5 kilometres from the Bundesautobahn 5 (motorway connecting Karlsruhe and Basel). There also is a good train connection to the Kaiserstuhl Railway which calls at the village every half an hour on workdays. With this train Freiburg town center can be reached within 15 minutes.

The two farms Au(stucken)mühle and Herrenmühle also belong to the Eichstetten area.

== History ==
There is evidence of people living in the Eichstetten area as early as the Stone Age. Remains of a Villa rustica from the Roman era (3rd century) as well as finds of Allemannic burial sites (around 600 AD) prove that people settled here for a very long time.
