= Bötzingen =

- Municipality
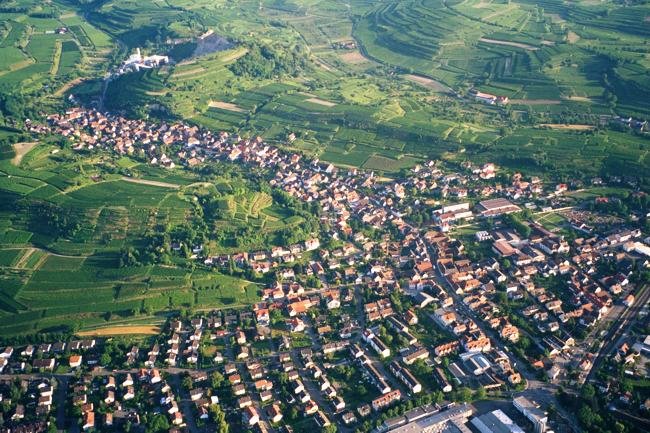

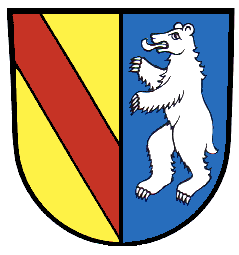
- Coat of arms

- Location of Bötzingen within Breisgau-Hochschwarzwald district
- Interactive map of Bötzingen
- Location within Germany Location within Baden-Württemberg
- Coordinates: 48°4′37″N 7°43′32″E
- Country: Germany
- State: Baden-Württemberg
- Admin. region: Freiburg
- District: Breisgau-Hochschwarzwald
- Subdivisions: 2

Government
  - Mayor (2019–27): Dieter Schneckenburger

Area
  - Total: 12.99 km^{2} (5.02 sq mi)
- Elevation: 192 m (630 ft)

Population (2025-12-31)
  - Total: 5,517
  - Density: 424.7/km^{2} (1,100/sq mi)
- Time zone: UTC+01:00 (CET)
  - Summer (DST): UTC+02:00 (CEST)
- Postal codes: 79268
- Dialling codes: 07663
- Vehicle registration: FR
- Website: www.boetzingen.de

Bötzingen is a municipality in the Breisgau-Hochschwarzwald district, Baden-Württemberg, Germany.

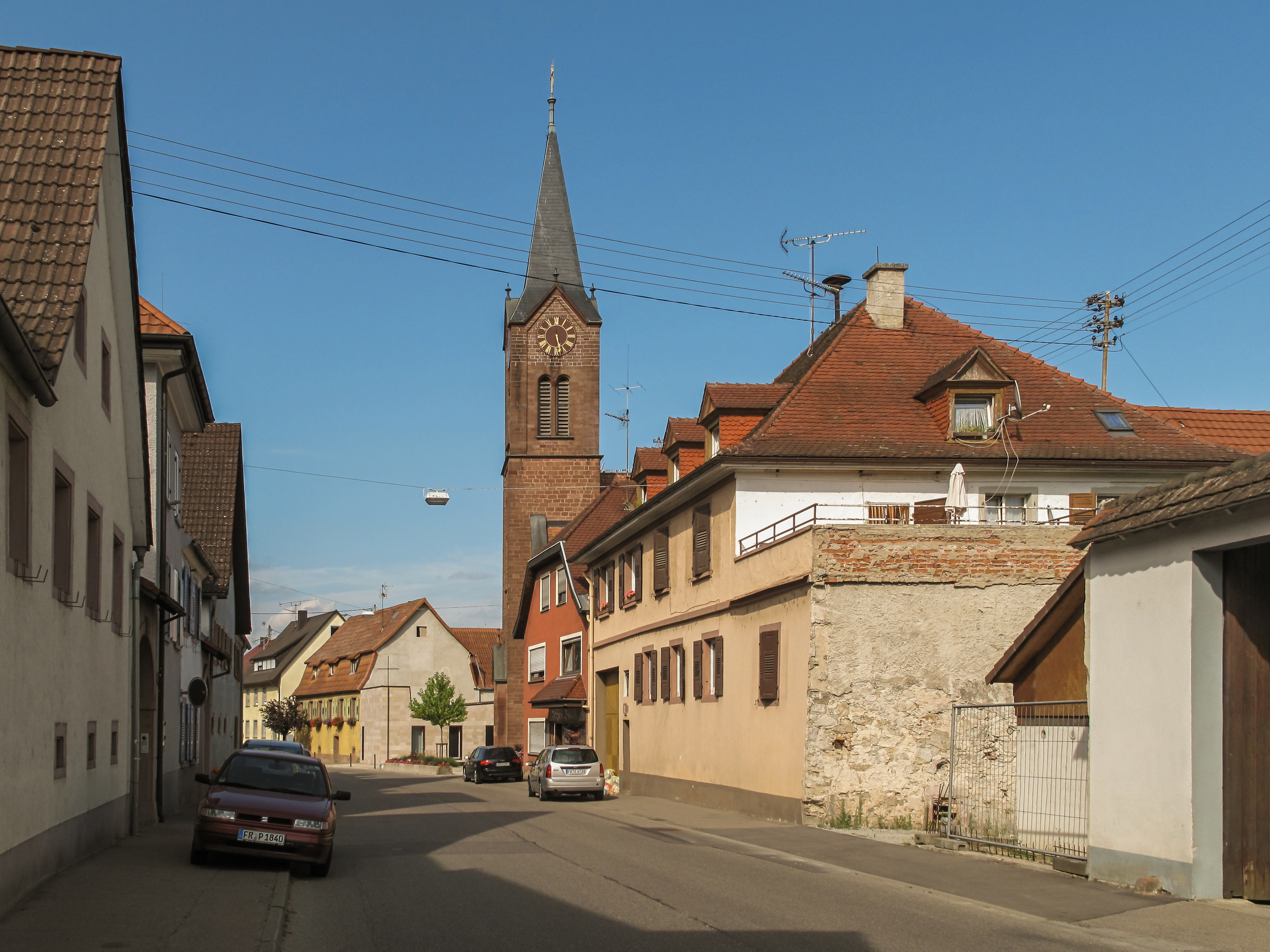
Bötzingen, reformed church in the street

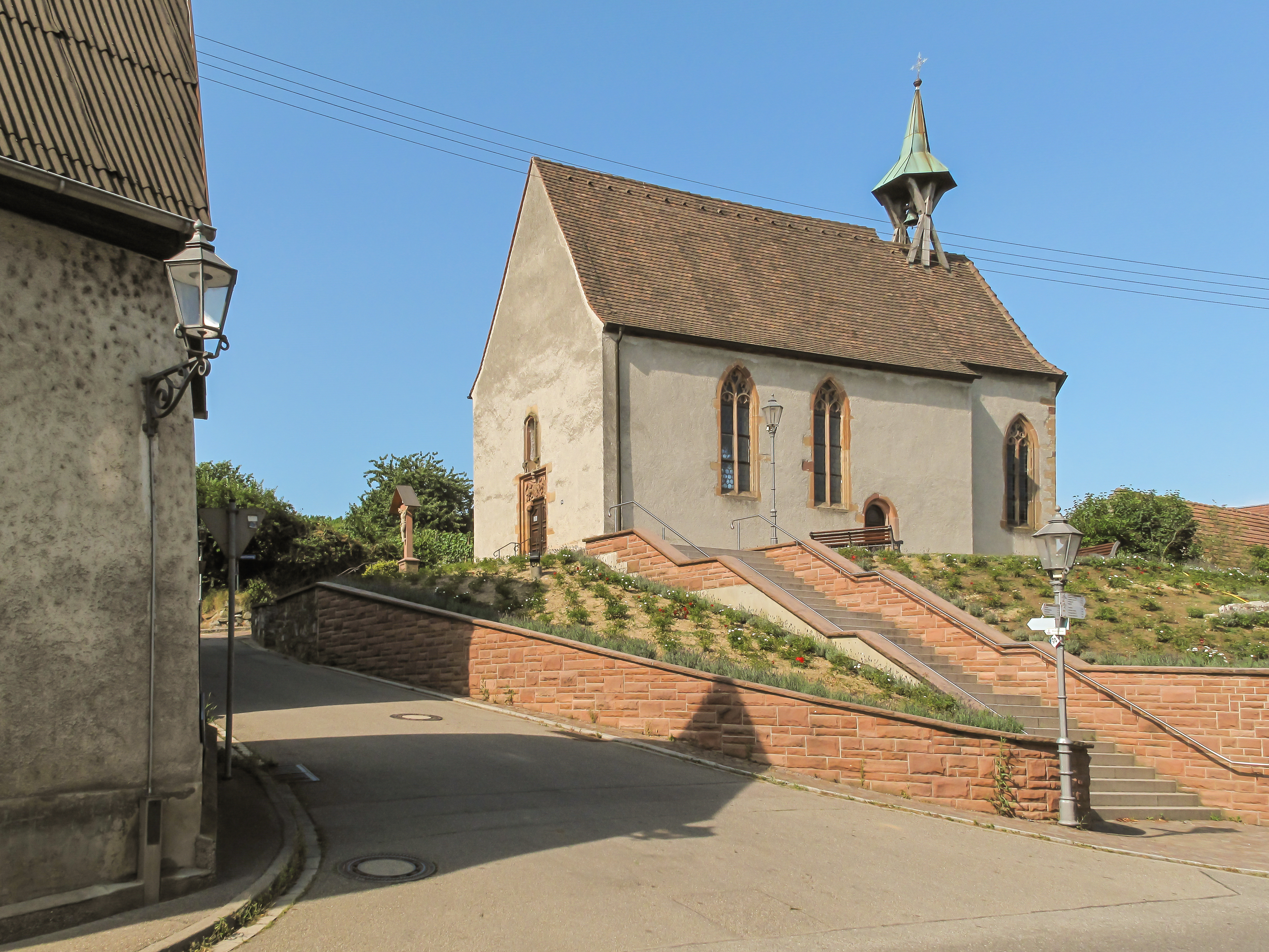
Bötzingen, chapel: die Sankt Alban Kapelle
