= Ihringen =

- Municipality
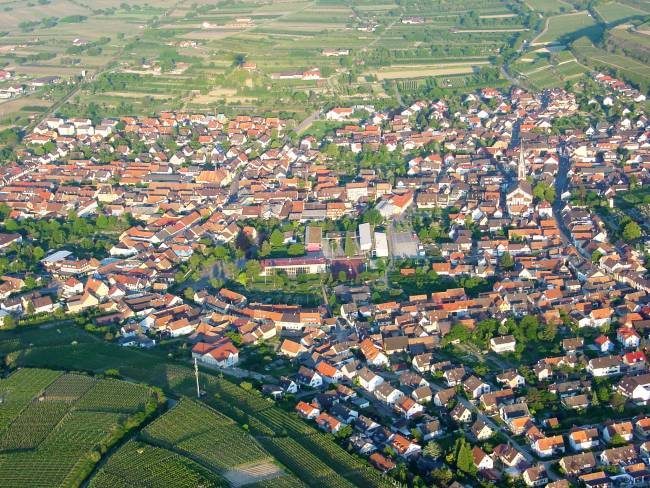
- Aerial view

- Coat of arms

- Location of Ihringen within Breisgau-Hochschwarzwald district
- Interactive map of Ihringen
- Location within Germany Location within Baden-Württemberg
- Coordinates: 48°3′N 7°39′E
- Country: Germany
- State: Baden-Württemberg
- Admin. region: Freiburg
- District: Breisgau-Hochschwarzwald
- Subdivisions: 2

Government
  - Mayor (2017–25): Benedikt Eckerle (Ind.)

Area
  - Total: 23.00 km^{2} (8.88 sq mi)
- Elevation: 202 m (663 ft)

Population (2025-12-31)
  - Total: 6,283
  - Density: 273.2/km^{2} (707.5/sq mi)
- Time zone: UTC+01:00 (CET)
  - Summer (DST): UTC+02:00 (CEST)
- Postal codes: 79241
- Dialling codes: 07668
- Vehicle registration: FR
- Website: www.ihringen.de

Ihringen is a town in the district of Breisgau-Hochschwarzwald in Baden-Württemberg in Germany, just east of Breisach am Rhein and west of Freiburg im Breisgau at the southern end of the Kaiserstuhl. It is known for its wine.

== Climate ==
By most sources, it is the warmest place in Germany.

Under the Köppen system, Ihringen has an oceanic climate (Cfb), closely bordering an incredibly rare 48°N humid subtropical climate (Cfa), with mildly cold winters and long, hot summers. The city is close to the Kaiserstuhl, a range of hills of volcanic origin located a few miles away which is considered to be one of the warmest places of Germany and therefore one of the most important viticultural area.

=== Climate types ===
Climate data for Ihringen (Freiburg 2015–2020, sunshine 2015–2020, extremes 1949–present)
Month	Jan	Feb	Mar	Apr	May	Jun	Jul	Aug	Sep	Oct	Nov	Dec	Year
Record high °C (°F)	18.8 (65.8)	21.9 (71.4)	25.7 (78.3)	29.4 (84.9)	33.7 (92.7)	36.5 (97.7)	38.3 (100.9)	40.2 (104.4)	33.9 (93.0)	30.8 (87.4)	23.2 (73.8)	21.7 (71.1)	40.2 (104.4)
Mean daily maximum °C (°F)	5.7 (42.3)	7.9 (46.2)	12.6 (54.7)	16.7 (62.1)	20.3 (68.5)	25.0 (77.0)	27.8 (82.0)	27.5 (81.5)	22.3 (72.1)	16.2 (61.2)	10.2 (50.4)	7.9 (46.2)	16.7 (62.1)
Daily mean °C (°F)	2.8 (37.0)	4.0 (39.2)	7.2 (45.0)	10.6 (51.1)	14.5 (58.1)	19.0 (66.2)	21.3 (70.3)	21.0 (69.8)	16.1 (61.0)	11.4 (52.5)	6.7 (44.1)	4.6 (40.3)	11.6 (52.9)
Mean daily minimum °C (°F)	0.0 (32.0)	0.1 (32.2)	1.9 (35.4)	4.6 (40.3)	8.8 (47.8)	13.8 (56.8)	14.8 (58.6)	14.4 (57.9)	10.0 (50.0)	6.6 (43.9)	3.1 (37.6)	1.3 (34.3)	6.6 (43.9)
Record low °C (°F)	−18 (0)	−21.6 (−6.9)	−11.9 (10.6)	−5.2 (22.6)	−1.4 (29.5)	3.2 (37.8)	5.3 (41.5)	4.5 (40.1)	0.6 (33.1)	−5.9 (21.4)	−10.4 (13.3)	−19.9 (−3.8)	−21.6 (−6.9)
Average precipitation mm (inches)	44.5 (1.75)	42.9 (1.69)	36.7 (1.44)	77 (3.0)	96.2 (3.79)	76.3 (3.00)	52.5 (2.07)	53.4 (2.10)	45.4 (1.79)	49.0 (1.93)	66.2 (2.61)	35.9 (1.41)	676.1 (26.62)
Average rainy days (≥ 0.2 mm)	19.7	11.9	13.9	14.5	13.2	12.9	11.8	11.4	10.3	12.9	13.9	13.5	159.8
Mean monthly sunshine hours	29.2	93.4	150.0	184.1	204.2	241.7	263.2	190.8	187.3	110.7	61.1	68.2	1,784.1
Source 1: Weatheronline.de
Source 2: Meteociel.fr
