= Sasbach am Kaiserstuhl =

- Municipality
- Coat of arms

- Location of Sasbach am Kaiserstuhl within Emmendingen district
- Interactive map of Sasbach am Kaiserstuhl
- Location within Germany Location within Baden-Württemberg
- Coordinates: 48°8′22″N 7°37′2″E
- Country: Germany
- State: Baden-Württemberg
- Admin. region: Freiburg
- District: Emmendingen
- Subdivisions: 3

Government
  - Mayor (2024–32): Nikolas Kopp

Area
  - Total: 20.78 km^{2} (8.02 sq mi)
- Elevation: 181 m (594 ft)

Population (2025-12-31)
  - Total: 3,485
  - Density: 167.7/km^{2} (434.4/sq mi)
- Time zone: UTC+01:00 (CET)
  - Summer (DST): UTC+02:00 (CEST)
- Postal codes: 79361
- Dialling codes: 07642, Jechtingen 07662
- Vehicle registration: EM
- Website: www.sasbach-am-kaiserstuhl.de

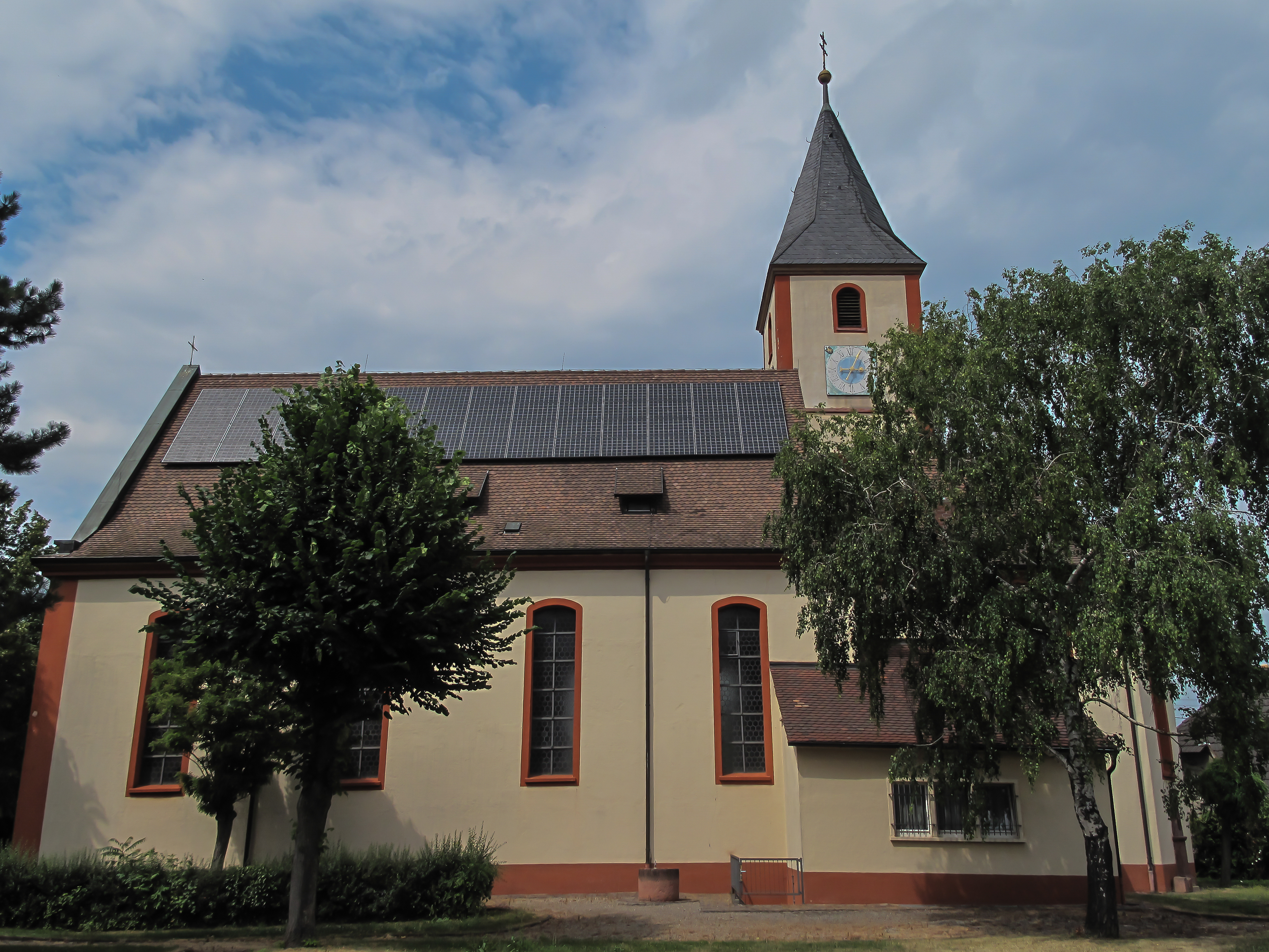
Sasbach, church: die Sankt Martin Kirche

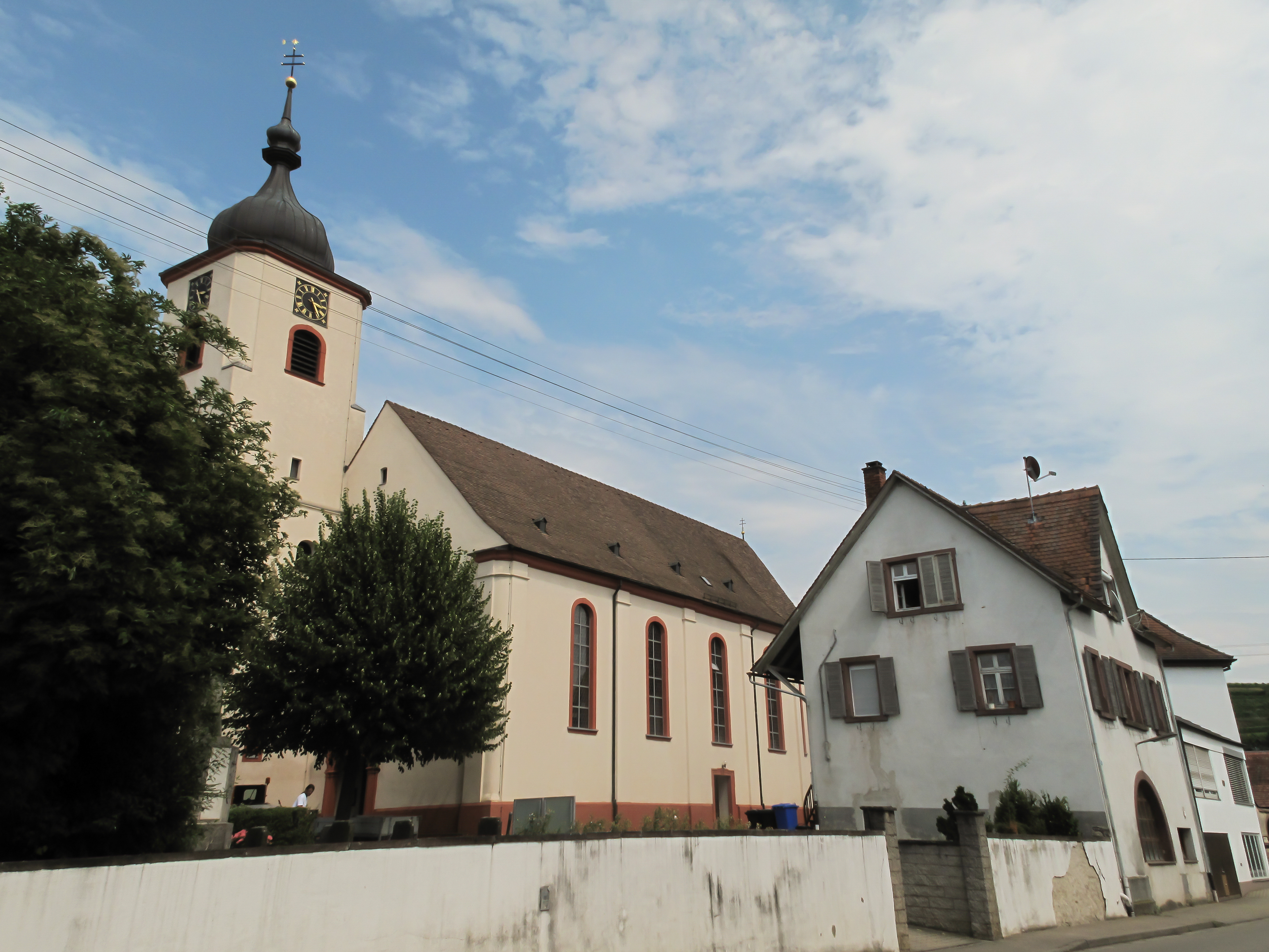
Jechtingen, church in the street

Sasbach am Kaiserstuhl (German pronunciation: [ˈzasbax ʔam ˈkaɪzɐʃtuːl], lit. 'Sasbach in the Kaiserstuhl') is a municipality in the district of Emmendingen in Baden-Württemberg in Germany. Sasbach is adjacent to the river Rhine and the Kaiserstuhl mountain range. It is the location of two medieval castle ruins, Limburg and Sponeck.
