= Upper Rhine Plain =

Major rift between Basel and Frankfurt/Wiesbaden

Coordinates: 48.9650°N 8.2340°E

The Upper Rhine Plain, Rhine Rift Valley or Upper Rhine Graben (German: Oberrheinische Tiefebene, Oberrheinisches Tiefland or Oberrheingraben, French: Vallée du Rhin) is a major rift, about 350-kilometre-long (220 mi) and on average 50-kilometre-wide (31 mi), between Basel in the south and the cities of Frankfurt/Wiesbaden in the north. Its southern section straddles the France–Germany border. It forms part of the European Cenozoic Rift System, which extends across Central Europe. The Upper Rhine Graben formed during the Oligocene, as a response to the evolution of the Alps to the south. It remains active to the present day. Today, the Rhine Rift Valley forms a downfaulted trough through which the river Rhine flows.

== Formation ==
Satellite image showing the southern section of the Upper Rhine Plain and the rift flanks of Vosges, France, and the Black Forest, Germany

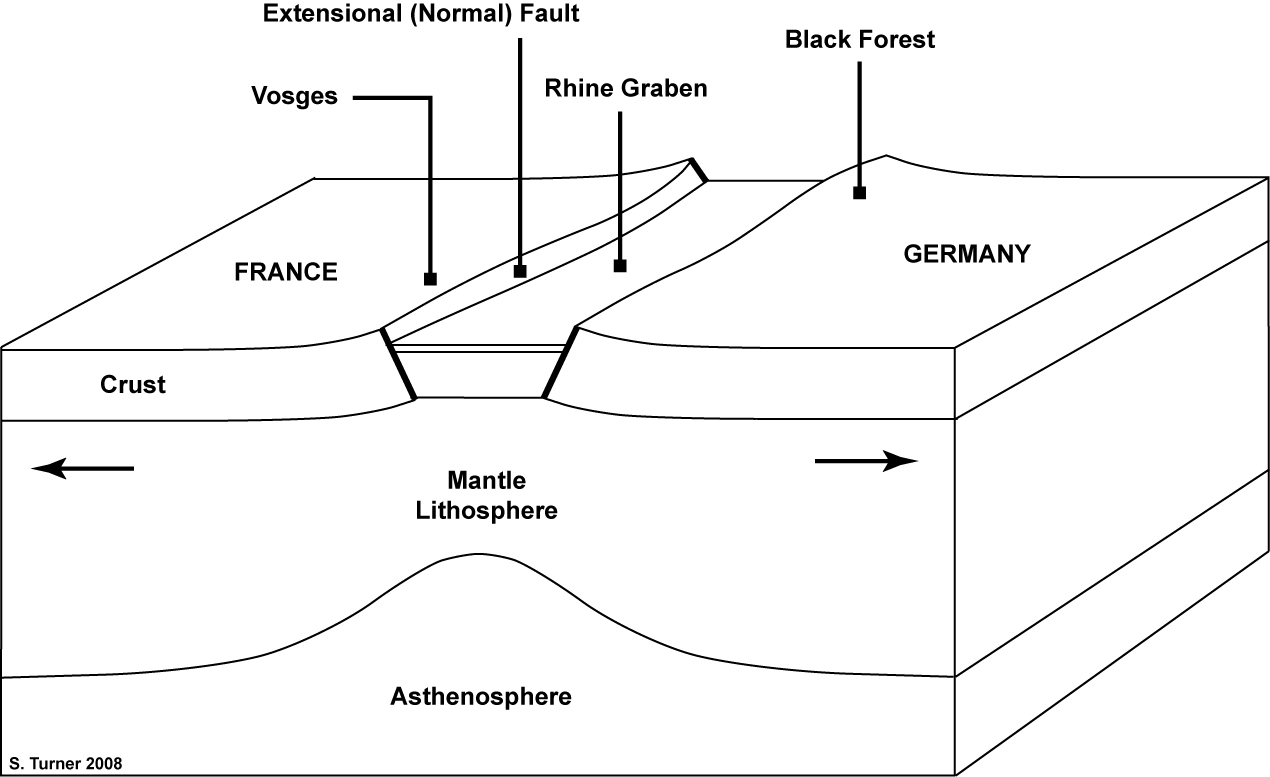
Schematic cross-section of the Rhine Rift Valley

The Upper Rhine Plain was formed during the Early Cenozoic era, during the Late Eocene epoch. At this time, the Alpine Orogeny, the major mountain building event that was to produce the Alps, was in its early stages. The Alps were formed because the continents of Europe and Africa collided. It is thought that because the collision was irregular, the initial contact between the two continents resulted in the formation of dilational (extensional) structures in the foreland basin to the north of the Alps. The result was substantial crustal thinning, forming a major extensional graben and causing isolated volcanic activity. The stretch factor is estimated to be ~2.

=== Rift flank uplift ===
To both the east and west of the Rhine Plain, two major hill ranges have formed that run the length of the basin. To the west, in France, these hills are known as the Vosges mountain range and in the east, in Germany, the hills comprise the Black Forest. These ranges exhume the same types of rocks in their cores, including deep crustal gneiss. Both ranges correspond to uplifts of more than 2,500 metres, much of which has since been eroded. This uplift has occurred because of the isostatic response associated with the formation of an extensional basin. As a consequence, the highest mountains exist immediately adjacent to the margin of the basin, and become increasingly low outwards. The boundaries between the hill ranges and the Rhine Graben are defined by major, normal fault zones.

The northern section of the Rhine Plain is equally framed by somewhat lower mountain ranges, the Palatinate Forest on the western and the Odenwald on the eastern side.

== Volcanic activity ==
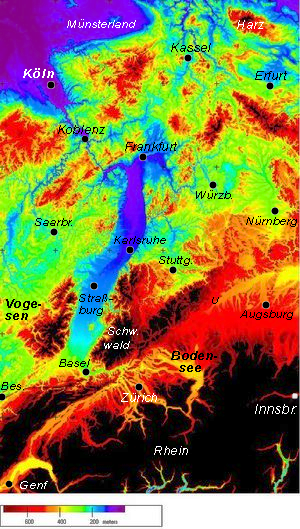
Rhine Graben (blue shades) between Basel and Frankfurt with adjoining mountain ranges (green to brown); colour-coding according to digital elevation model

The extension induced by the formation of the Alps was sufficient to thin the crust and provide suitable dilational conduits for magmatic and volcanic activity to occur. This resulted in the emplacement of mafic dykes, which follow the general structural trend of the extensional faults. In addition, isolated volcanoes such as the Kaiserstuhl were formed.

=== The Kaiserstuhl volcano ===
The Kaiserstuhl (literally "Emperor's Chair") is a cluster of volcanic hills to the northwest of Freiburg, within the Rhine Graben. The highest point of this small, isolated volcanic centre is the Totenkopf (557 metres). Volcanic activity was most prevalent in the Miocene epoch, some 15 million years ago. Today, the Kaiserstuhl volcano is extinct.

== Seismic activity ==
In 1356, the Basel earthquake occurred in the Rhine Plain. It was perhaps the most destructive earthquake ever in northwest Europe, destroying the city of Basel and flattening buildings as far as 200 km away. It was the most significant historic seismological event to have occurred in Central Europe. Its epicenter was between Waldkirch and St. Peter in Breisgau-Hochschwarzwald. However, it remains disputed whether the fault that ruptured to cause this earthquake was part of the Rhine Valley extensional system, or simply one of the many thrust faults that make up the Alps to the south. Doubts have been raised over the adequacy of the seismic evaluation and design of the Fessenheim Nuclear Power Plant, built in the Rhine Plain close to the faults.

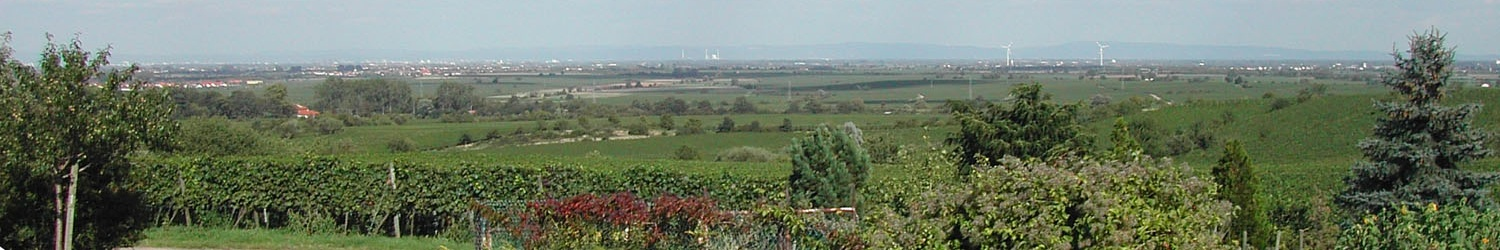
The Upper Rhine Plain, view from west to east. Front: a vineyard near Neustadt an der Weinstraße, background: Mannheim (right: Mannheim Power Station, far north: the Odenwald

== Upper Rhine aquifer ==
Located below the plain, the Upper Rhine aquifer – one of the largest in Europe – holds an estimated 45,000 km^{3} (11,000 mi^{3}) of fresh water and supplies some 3 million people in France and Germany, supplying 75% of their drinking water and 50% of the water used by industry. Since the 1970s it has suffered increasingly serious pollution from nitrates, pesticides, chloride and VOCs.

== Research ==
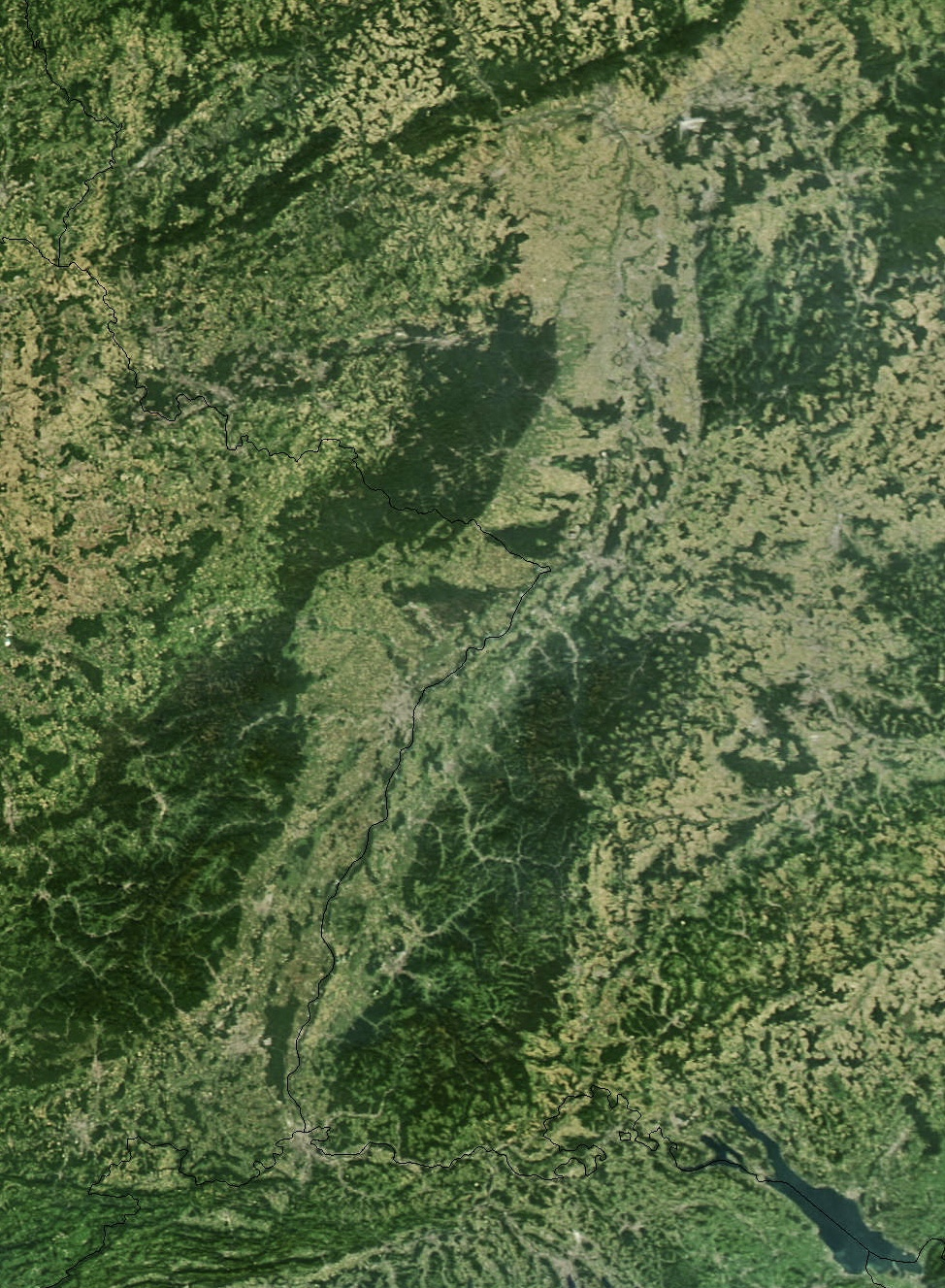
A satellite view of the plain: Shot taken by NASA satellite

A collaboration of 25 universities and government agencies have been researching seismic hazards, neotectonics, and water management of the Quaternary Graben fill. The research focuses on four themes:

- "Neotectonics and Seismic Hazard (identification of zones of on-going deformation, current stress regime, earthquake location & frequency, hazard assessment)"
- "Modeling of Hydro systems (modeling of Plio-Quaternary hydro systems of the Upper Rhine Graben and transfer time of pollutants within them)"
- "Structure and Evolution (reassessment of structural evolution of the Upper Rhine Graben and implications for its neotectonic deformation, fault reactivation, crustal rheology and earthquake activity)"
- "Dynamic Modeling (multi scale dynamic modeling of the past and present deformation of the Rhine Graben area)"

== See also ==
- Ried
- Munzingen culture which grew in this plain from around 4000 to 3500 BC
