= Gundelfingen =

- Municipality
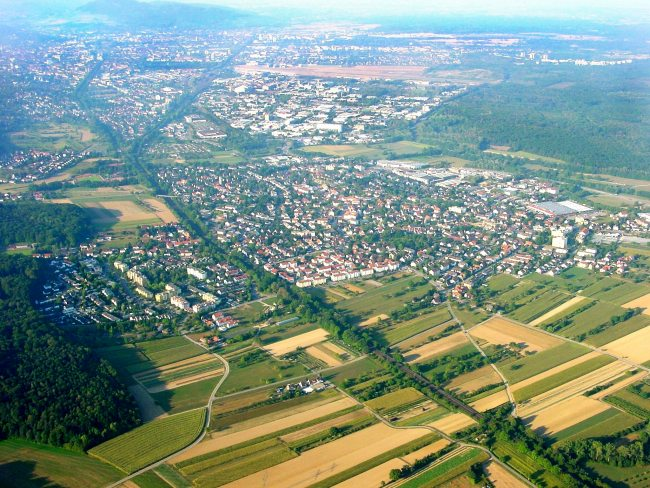
- Aerial view

- Coat of arms

- Location of Gundelfingen within Breisgau-Hochschwarzwald district
- Interactive map of Gundelfingen
- Location within Germany Location within Baden-Württemberg
- Coordinates: 48°3′N 7°52′E
- Country: Germany
- State: Baden-Württemberg
- Admin. region: Freiburg
- District: Breisgau-Hochschwarzwald
- Subdivisions: 2

Government
  - Mayor (2022–30): Raphael Walz

Area
  - Total: 14.29 km^{2} (5.52 sq mi)
- Elevation: 266 m (873 ft)

Population (2025-12-31)
  - Total: 12,146
  - Density: 850.0/km^{2} (2,201/sq mi)
- Time zone: UTC+01:00 (CET)
  - Summer (DST): UTC+02:00 (CEST)
- Postal codes: 79194
- Dialling codes: 0761
- Vehicle registration: FR
- Website: www.gundelfingen.de

Gundelfingen (German pronunciation: [ˈɡʊndl̩ˌfɪŋən]; Low Alemannic: Gundelfinge) is a municipality directly north of the city Freiburg in Baden-Württemberg in southern Germany.

Gundelfingen is one of the larger municipalities in the Breisgau-Hochschwarzwald district. It consists of the old place Gundelfingen and the village Wildtal, which was included in the municipality in the 1970s.

== History ==
=== Gundelfingen ===
Gundelfingen was founded in the 4th century, so at least the suffix "-ingen" suggests. The name means that some Alamannic chief by the name of Gundolf settled there with his folk. The first sure sign of Gundelfingen's existence is found in a 1008 treaty, where a place called Gondalvingen is named.

In 1327, Gundelfingen was sold by Counts Konrad and Friedrich of Freiburg to Schnewelin Bernlapp. In 1507, his successor Balthasar von Blumeneck sold Gundelfingen again, this time to Margrave Christopher I of Baden. Since then it was part of Baden.

In the 16th century, some 350 inhabitants lived in Gundelfingen. In 1825 it was 620, in 1950 1,817. Only in the 1960s and 1970s the numbers started to expand quickly to 5,016 inhabitants in 1970 and 11,000 inhabitants in 2002.

=== Wildtal ===
Wildtal was first named in a document in 1273 as Wülptal (whelp dale) or Wolfstal (wolf's dale). The present name just translates as "wild dale".

== Administration ==
In 1972, Wildtal was included into the municipality of Gundelfingen, after three quarters of its citizens voted for this inclusion.

The Mayor of Gundelfingen is at the same time the Mayor of the neighboring village Heuweiler which is associated for administrative purposes.

== Environs ==
On the territory that belongs to the municipality of Gundelfingen you can, inter alia, find the following:

=== Protestant Church ===
==== Stork's nest ====
Since 1993 storks are nesting again in Gundelfingen. Their nest is on the steeple of the Protestant church at the corner of the streets Kirchstraße and Kirchenwinkel.

==== Luthereiche (Luther's oak) ====
The "Luthereiche" (Luther's oak) which was planted next to the Protestant church in 1883 on the occasion of 400th birthday of the reformer Martin Luther was the first natural monument of Gundelfingen. A plaque commemorating it is on the outside wall of the church. The tree of a height of 50 ft was felled in 2011 because of dry rot. It is highly likely that a new oak will be planted in its place, perhaps in 2017 when the 500th anniversary of the protestant reformation will be celebrated. Such an oak has the function of a monument commemorating the Reformation. The very first oak with that purpose was planted in Wittenberg on the same spot where Luther had publicly burned the papal bull.

=== East of the Railway ===
==== Pond ====
This pond is located in a small park in the middle of the residential area Am See (at the lake) to the east of the train station. Mallards as well as goldfish are living there.

==== Birding trail ====
Further to the East, in the forest just above the streets Sonnhalde and Jägerpfad, there is a birding trail with more than 40 nest boxes where numerous species of birds are breeding. Furthermore, a large number of birds which do not have their nests in cavities can be observed there as well.

==== Rebberg ====
The hill to the south of this area and the north of the street Am Rebberg, itself to the north of the road connecting Gundelfingen and Wildtal, is called "Rebberg" which is the German word for vineyard, because on its slope grapes are cultivated for winemaking. The varietals cultivated here are primarily for red and white Burgundy.

==== Leheneck ====
Further to the northeast there is a low saddle called "Leheneck", 1060 ft above sea level, which has views towards the north (Heuweiler) and the south (Wildtal).

=== Wildtal ===
Wildtal is the name of both the village pertaining to Gundelfingen and the valley. The most important stream of this valley and of Gundelfingen is the Schobbach.

==== Dorfbrunnen ====
In Wildtal, at the corner of the streets Heuweilerweg and Talstraße, you see the "Dorfbrunnen" (village well).

==== Talstraße ====
The "Talstraße" (dale street) leads you right through the whole "Wildtal" valley.

==== Wildtalereck ====
At the end of the valley you come to the "Wildtalereck", 1496 ft above sea level, from where there are views towards the west.

==== Waldbrunnerhof ====
From the Talstraße the Waldbrunnerweg branches off towards the south. From around the farm called Waldbrunnerhof, 482 ft above sea level, one has a good view. The Waldbrunnerweg leads you to the castle.

==== Zähringen castle ====
The shortest way is from the cemetery of Wildtal through the mountain forest to the spot where Zähringen castle stood. Its tower is still standing. There is a restaurant nearby where you can also drive by car from Freiburg's suburb Zähringen.

=== Reutebacher Höfe ===
Reute means clearing, Bach stream, and Höfe yards. The Reutebach is a stream having its source on the Roßkopf and the Reutebacher Höfe are remote farmhouses on this mountain which are connected by a road, the Pochgasse, to Freiburg's suburb Zähringen. The area where they are located has the same name as the stream and is also called Reutebach. It was an enclave of Gundelfingen until the expansion of its boundaries by the incorporation of Wildtal.

Once Reutebach was an independent village and even larger than either Gundelfingen, Wildtal or Zähringen. The reasons for the degradation were religious and political. Whereas Gundelfingen and Reutebach were Badish, Wildtal and Zähringen belonged to Further Austria. As a result of the reformation, Baden became protestant and hence Reutebach a religious enclave.

Most of the territory that once constituted Reutebach now belongs to Zähringen. Leftovers of the church of Reutebach were discovered under the parking lot in the Harbuckweg (which branches off from the Pochgasse) in the forest of Zähringen just across the bridge over the Reutebach. In the past the villages Zähringen, Wildtal, and Gundelfingen belonged to the former parish of Reutebach.

The aforementioned parking lot is also a trailhead for walks to the Reutebacher Höfe and other spots on the Roßkopf such as the Roßkopfturm.

==== Rottecksruhe ====
From Zähringen castle you walk through the mountain forest to a spot called "Rottecksruhe" (Rotteck's rest), 1935 ft above sea level. Once there stood a farmhouse owned by Karl von Rotteck. In its place there is now a small hut where you can rest.

=== Roßkopf ===
The mountain on which you are walking is called Roßkopf (horsehead). It rises to 2418 ft above sea level.

==== Roßkopfturm ====
Just north of the mountain summit, next to a small shelter, stands the Roßkopfturm, a 34.4-metre-tall (113 ft) lattice tower erected in 1889. It overlooks Freiburg, the surrounding mountains, and the Upper Rhine Plain including the Tuniberg and the Kaiserstuhl. In clear weather, the Vosges across the Alsatian Plain in France are also visible.

==== Martinsfelsen ====
Heading east leads to the "Martinsfelsen" (Martin's rock), 686 meters (2,250 feet) above sea level, which offers a view overlooking the northern Breisgau.

==== Wind turbine ====
In 2003, four wind turbines were built. One of these four wind turbines is standing on the section of the mountain which belongs to Gundelfingen. Due to these wind turbines the Roßkopf is now easily recognizable from a distance.

=== Protected area ===
A large part of the mountainous area in the east of Gundelfingen was classified as a protected area of Baden-Württemberg under the name "Landschaftsschutzgebiet Gundelfingen-Wildtal-Heuweiler". Heuweiler is a neighboring village which is associated with Gundelfingen for administrative purposes.

== Religion ==
A church was mentioned in Gundelfingen for the first time in 1275. However, only since the implementation of the Reformation in the Margraviate of Baden in 1556 Gundelfingen had its own (from then on protestant) minister.

The Baptists established themselves in Gundelfingen in 1877.

The Catholic parish church Brother Klaus was built in 1975.

There is even a Russian orthodox chapel in an isolated location in the Roßwinkel which is cut off by Bundesstraße (federal highway) B 3 which is bypassing Gundelfingen in the West.

== Road traffic ==
The region has a well-developed road network:

Bundesstraße (federal highway) B 3 (from Buxtehude in the Hamburg Metropolitan Region in Northern Germany to Weil am Rhein on the Swiss border) which once crossed Gundelfingen is now bypassing it so as to tackle traffic congestion. Nevertheless, on its former course through Gundelfingen it is still called Alte (old) Bundesstraße and remains its main street connecting it with Freiburg.

Bundesstraße B 294 (from Freudenstadt in the Northern Black Forest to Freiburg) is also closely bypassing Gundelfingen and connecting it with Autobahn (motorway) A 5 (from three-leg motorway interchange Hattenbacher Dreieck near Bad Hersfeld in northeastern Hesse to Basel in Switzerland).

Moreover, there are local roads to the neighboring villages Heuweiler and Vörstetten.

== Public transport ==
=== Bus and tram ===
Gundelfingen is served by feeder buses to the tram network operated by Freiburger Verkehrs AG, OVS Schumacher, Rast Reisen and Binninger. Lines: 15 (Wildtal, "Berggasse" in Freiburg), 16 (industrial area oft Gundelfingen, railway station), 13 ("Blumenstraße" and the industrial area of Gundelfingen) and 24 (to the West of Freiburg through the industrial area Industriegebiet Freiburg Nord).

Buses to the hinterland are operated by SüdbadenBus, but practically all are bypassing Gundelfingen and you have to change in Freiburg.

In addition, bus line 201 from Freiburg to Vörstetten and further on to Reute and Nimburg (Teningen-Nimburg) which is operated by Binninger.

Near the border to Freiburg is the new terminal Station oft the tramline 2. In the morning and in the afternoon, line 5 is driving to the station, which name is "Gundelfinger Straße" (Street of Gundelfingen), too. The Station is also the terminal station of the buslines 13, 15, 16, 22 (Bissier Street), 24, 25 (Hugstetten railway station), 201, 7203 (Denzlingen) and 1076 (Colmar in France).

=== Rail ===
Gundelfingen is located on the Rhine Valley Railway Line Karlsruhe - Basel and the trains of two regional train operators are stopping at its train station: DB Regio and Breisgau S-Bahn (the latter operating the line branching off to Elzach).

== Carnival ==
In Gundelfingen there are two official carnival clubs:

- Gundelfinger Dorfhexen (village witches)
- Fässlistemmer (guys raising small barrels)

== Twinning ==
The first twinning arrangement was concluded in 1987 with the French town Meung-sur-Loire which has 6800 inhabitants and is located directly on the Loire approximately 19 miles from Orléans. Ten years later, in 1997, followed the Polish town Bieruń (German Berun) with approximately 20,000 inhabitants, 12 miles south of Katowice in Upper Silesia. Since 1997 a partnership has been maintained with the Saxon village Scheibenberg which has almost 2,400 residents.
