= Waltershofen (Freiburg im Breisgau) =

Coordinates: 48.0239°N 7.7214°E

Waltershofen (German pronunciation: [valtɐsˈhoːfn̩]) is a quarter (Stadtteil) with its own administration in the city of Freiburg im Breisgau. It is located about 15 km west of Freiburg at the foot of the Tuniberg, next to the autonomous municipalities of Gottenheim, Merdingen, Opfingen, and Umkirch in the administrative district of Breisgau-Hochschwarzwald.

Waltershofen has a population of 2,184 (as of Dec. 2020) and covers an area of 629.10 hectares (as of Dec. 2010).

Its sister town is Waltershofen im Allgäu.

== History ==
Waltershofen was first mentioned in official documents in 1139. During the Middle Ages the village belonged to the cloister of Sankt Märgen located in the Black Forest. Several noble families from Breisgau, such as the Schnewlins and the Dachswangers, ruled Waltershofen. For financial reasons the cloister had to sell the property by the end of the 15th century. Various aristocratic families continued ruling Waltershofen until it became affiliated with Baden in 1806, and finally with Baden-Württemberg in 1952. In 1972, Waltershofen became part of Freiburg im Breisgau.

== Architecture ==
The parish church of Saint Peter and Paul, located in the village center, was built by Christoph Arnold in the Weinbrenner style between 1816 and 1819 after the parish had been relocated from the neighboring village of Wippertskirch to Waltershofen. Before, the church of Wippertskirch had functioned as the church of the Schuttern cloister in Waltershofen. The new church was erected at the very spot where the Saint Margarete chapel had been built in 1270.

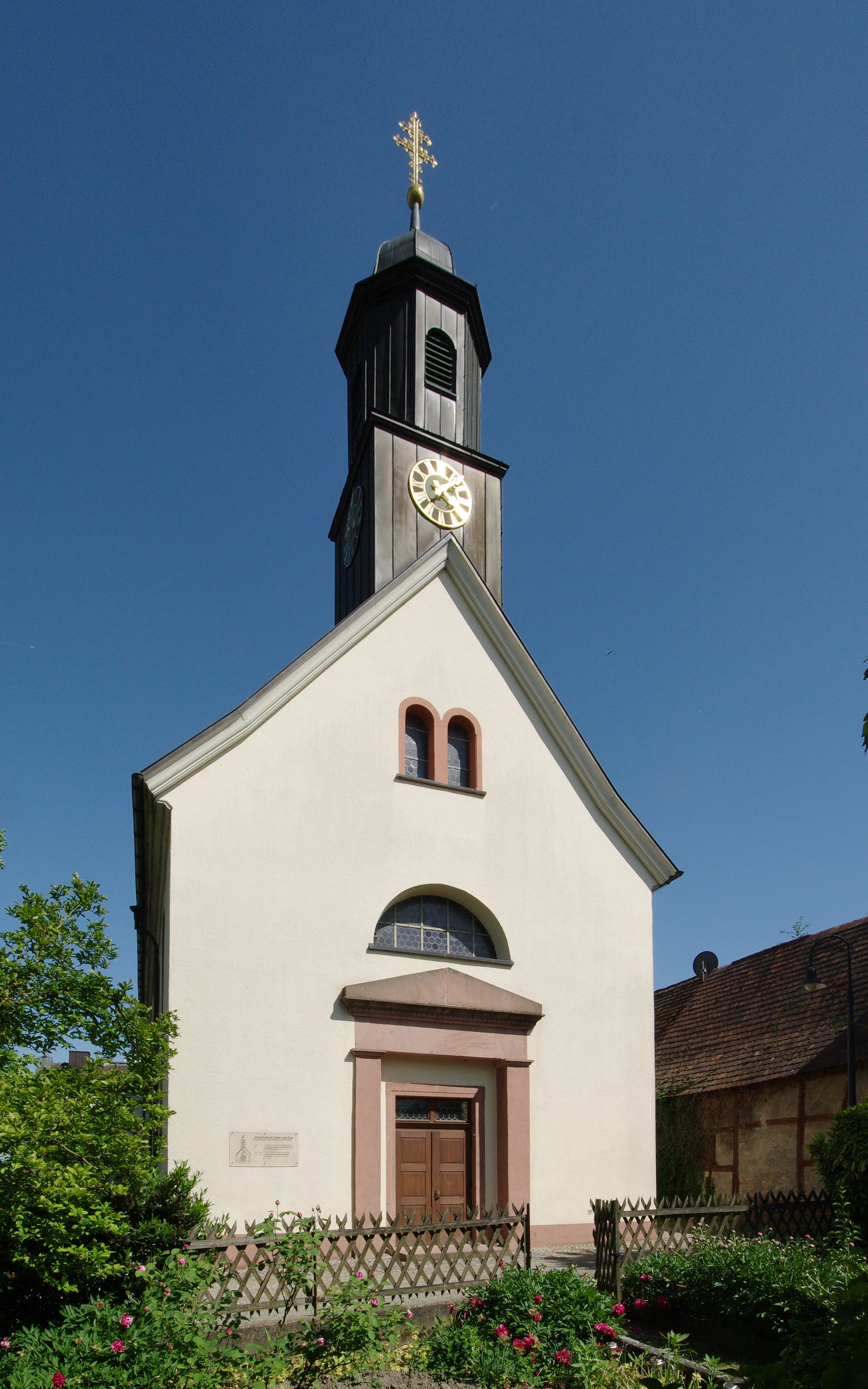
Main entrance of the Saint Peter and Paul church

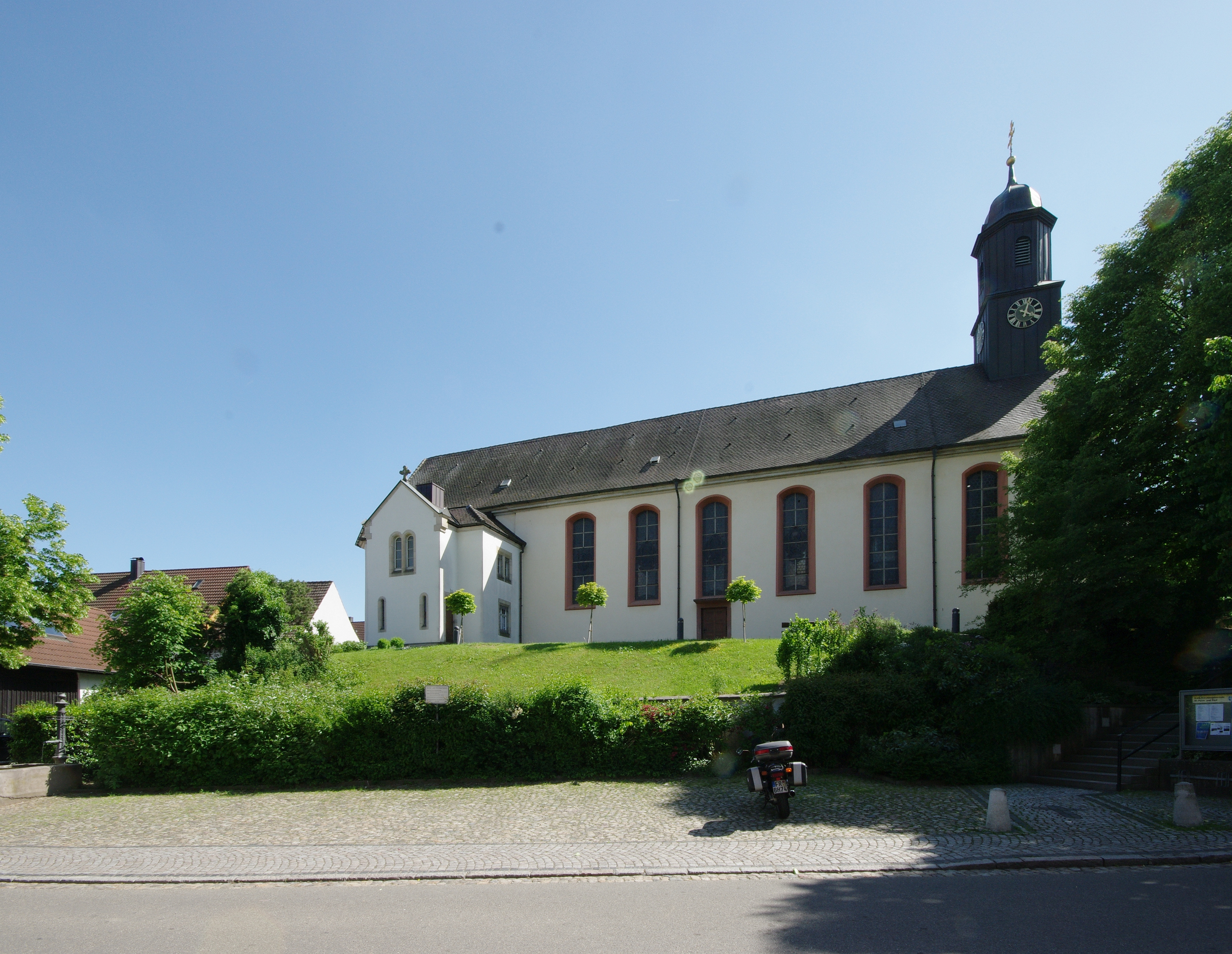
Catholic church of Saint Peter and Paul

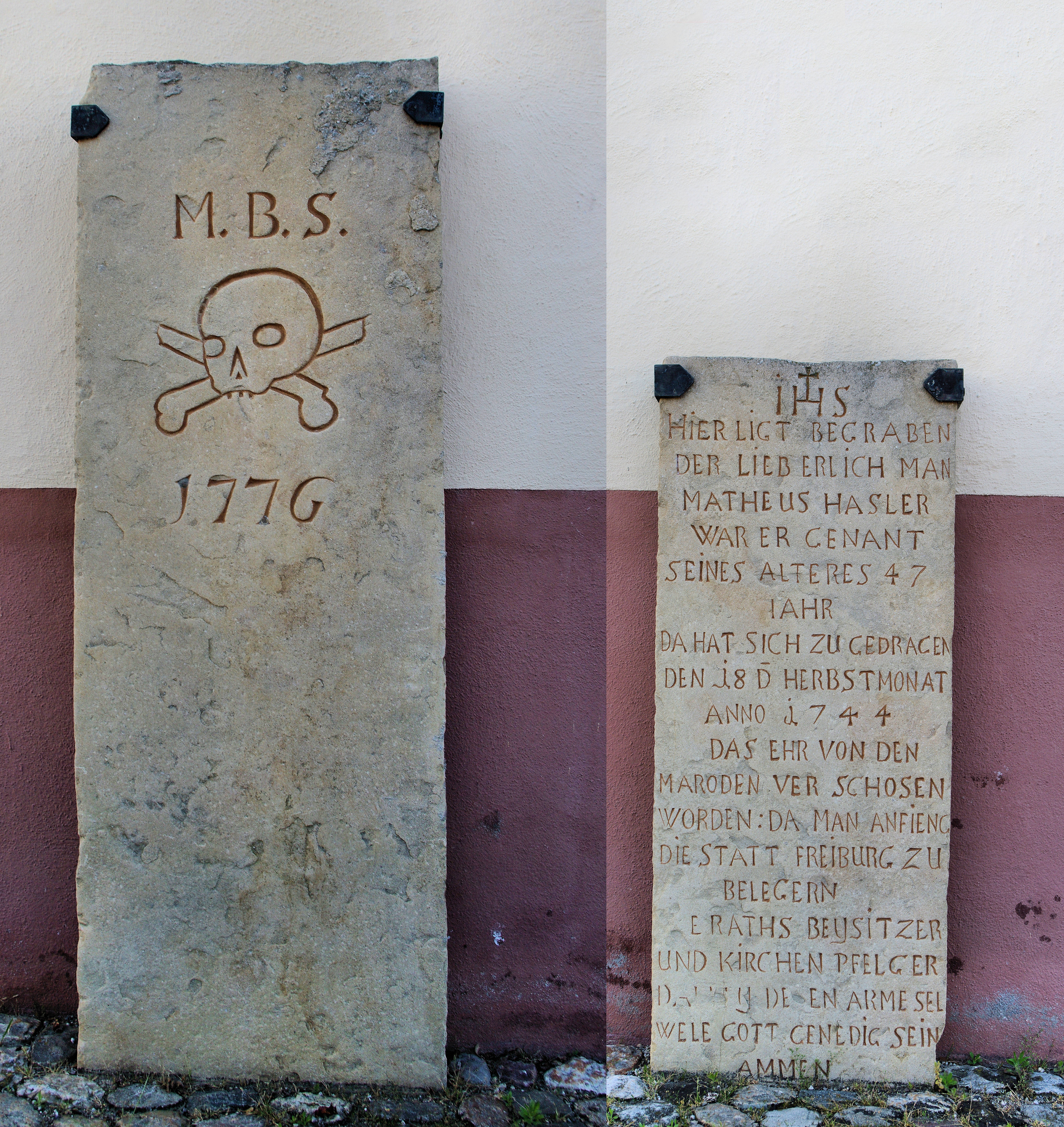
Headstones of Saint Peter and Paul outside the church
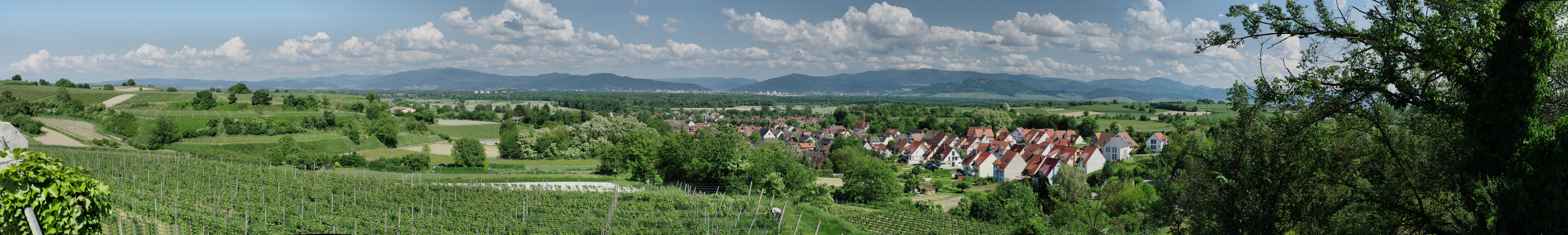
View of Waltershofen with Freiburg and the Black Forest in the background
