= Denzlingen =

- Municipality
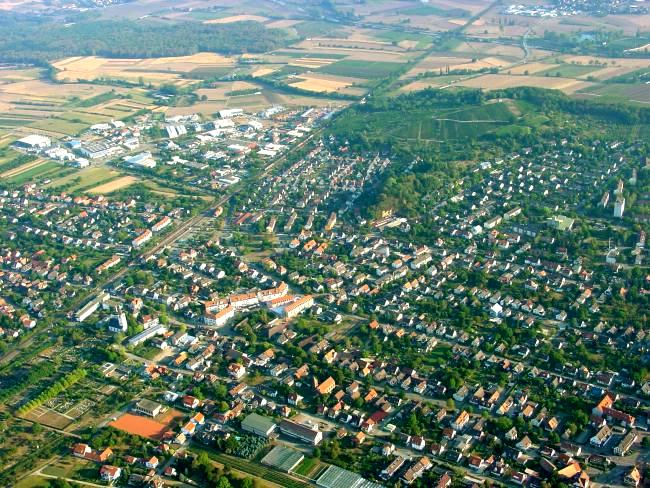
- Denzlingen

- Coat of arms

- Location of Denzlingen within Emmendingen district
- Interactive map of Denzlingen
- Location within Germany Location within Baden-Württemberg
- Coordinates: 48°4′6″N 7°52′57″E
- Country: Germany
- State: Baden-Württemberg
- Admin. region: Freiburg
- District: Emmendingen

Government
  - Mayor (2025 - 2033): Fabian Egle

Area
  - Total: 16.94 km^{2} (6.54 sq mi)
- Elevation: 234 m (768 ft)

Population (2025-12-31)
  - Total: 13,734
  - Density: 810.7/km^{2} (2,100/sq mi)
- Time zone: UTC+01:00 (CET)
  - Summer (DST): UTC+02:00 (CEST)
- Postal codes: 79211
- Dialling codes: 07666
- Vehicle registration: EM
- Website: www.denzlingen.de

Denzlingen (German pronunciation: [ˈdɛntslɪŋən]) is a municipality in the district of Emmendingen, in Baden-Württemberg, Germany. It is situated 8 kilometres (5.0 mi) north of Freiburg.

== Geography ==
Denzlingen is located in the Upper Rhine Valley (Oberrheinische Tiefebene) at the edge of the Black Forest (Schwarzwald) between the river Elz in the north and the Glotter which runs through the southern part of the town. The Glotter Valley (Glottertal) is to the east, and the Elz Valley (Elztal) to the northeast. The westernmost foothills of the Black Forest and the town of Freiamt lie to the north. From northwest to southwest the Upper Rhine Valley allows a clear view of the Kaiserstuhl hills and of the Vosges Mountains on the French side of the Rhine. The Mauracher Berg is a small mountain in the north of the township with some interesting geological features.

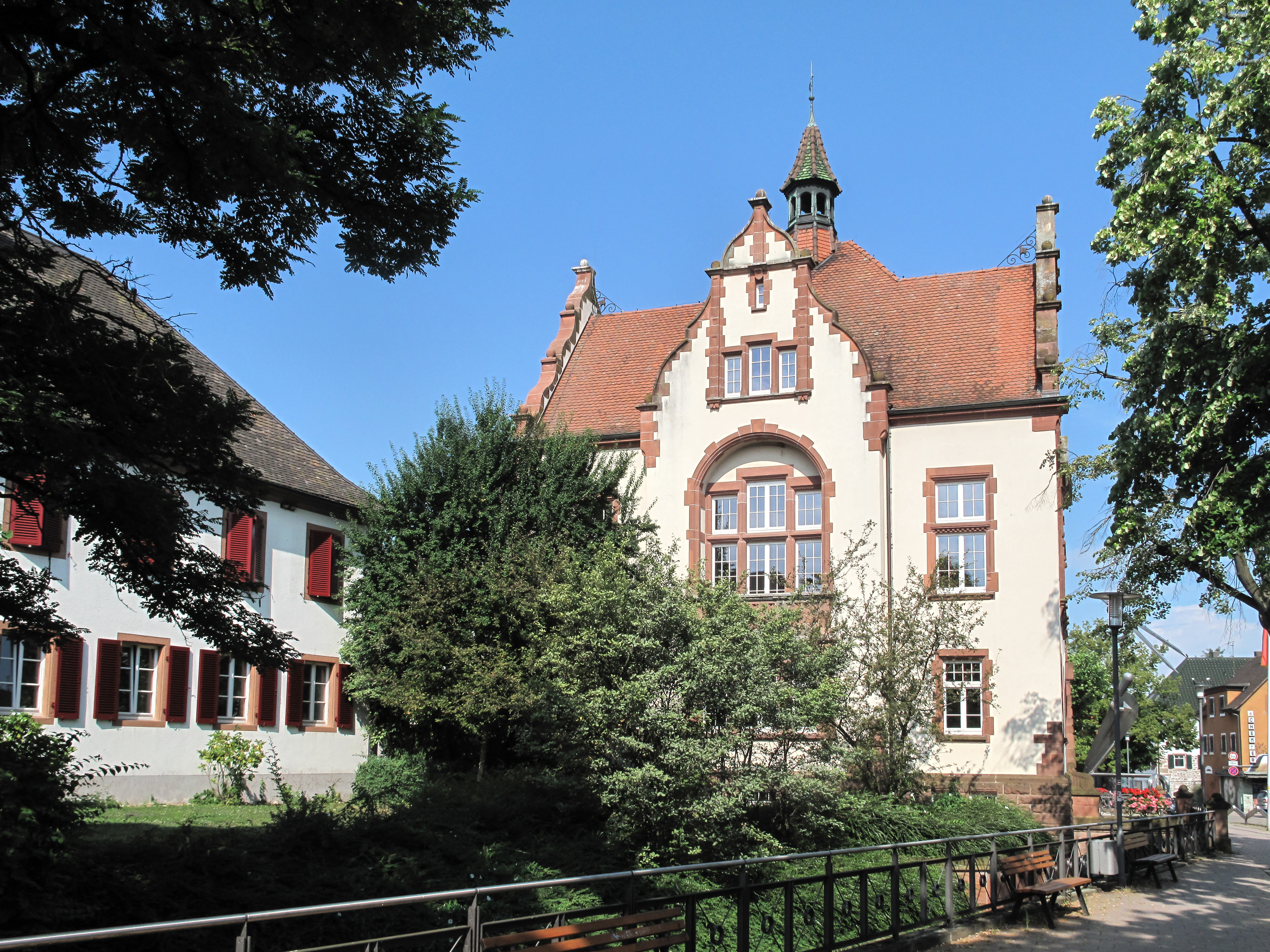
Former townhall

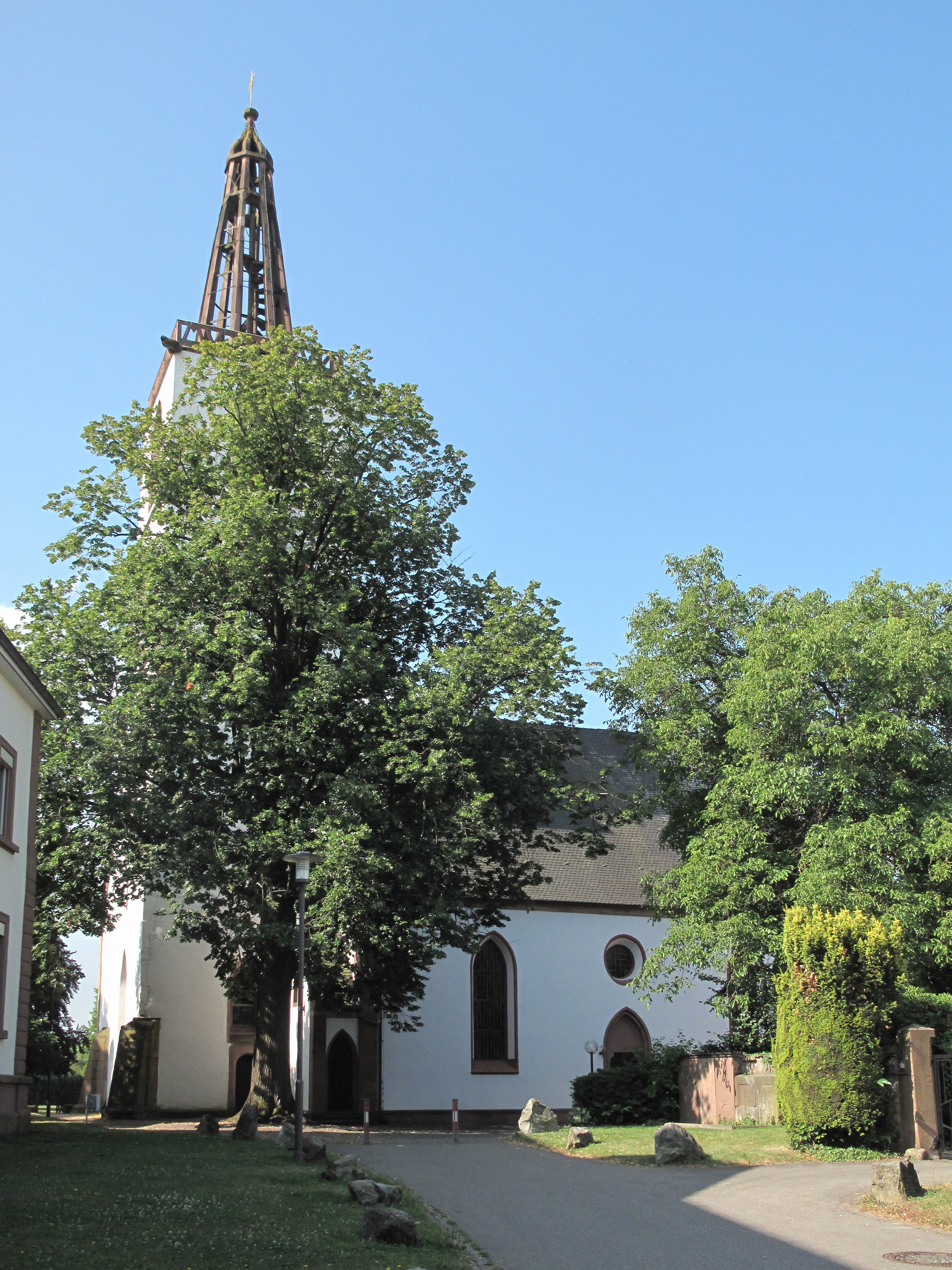
Church: die Georgskirche

=== Neighboring municipalities ===
Clockwise, starting in the north, Denzlingen is surrounded by Emmendingen, Sexau and Waldkirch in the district of Emmendingen, Glottertal, Heuweiler and Gundelfingen in the district Breisgau-Hochschwarzwald, and Vörstetten in the district of Emmendingen.

== History ==
Denzlingen was already settled during the time of the Roman Empire. It was named after the Alemannic tribal chief Denzilo who lived here in the 5th century. The first explicit mention of the town dates back to the year 984. Medieval Denzlingen consisted of two separate settlements, Niederdorf and Oberdorf (Lower Village and Upper Village), both on the Glotter and alongside an old road from Riegel to the Glottertal. The two settlements eventually grew together into one stretched-out town, which led to the sobriquet of Langendenzlingen, meaning "Long Denzlingen".

The town was destroyed during the Thirty Years' War. The Thirty Years' War veteran Hans Jakob Christoffel von Grimmelshausen described the battle between Imperial and Swedish troops at Denzlingen in the novel Simplicius Simplicissimus.

The town has grown rapidly since the 19th century, especially after being connected to the Baden railroad system in 1845.

=== Religion ===
As a former part of the Margraviate Baden, Denzlingen was predominantly Protestant. Today, 34% of the residents are Protestant. As most of the people moving to Denzlingen were Roman Catholics, the balance shifted, and today 42% of the inhabitants are Catholic. The first Catholic church after the Reformation was consecrated in 1888. Today, the Catholic community meets in St. James Church, which was built in the years 1975 and 1976. Other religious denominations (mostly members of the New Apostolic Church and Baptists) account for about 1% of the population, while 23% remain nondenominational.

=== Population ===
Year	1834	1910	1939	1950	1970	1990	2010	2020	2023
Population	1,207	1,865	2,488	2,937	6,458	11,567	13,712	13,585	13,923

As of 31 December of each year; source: Gemeinde Denzlingen, Zahlenspiegel

== Political situation ==
=== Civil parish ===
The last elections (9 June 2024) led to the following allocation of seats:

Grüne	23.3%	5 seats
CDU	21.0%	4 seats
BL	18.4%	4 seats
SPD	14.8%	3 seats
FWD	9.4%	2 seats
Independent Citizens/ÖDP	8.1%	2 seats

=== Mayor ===
After the latest election for major (11.05.2025), Fabian Egle is now major of Denzlingen.

=== Coat of arms ===
The coat of arms of Denzlingen is Or a bend gules (the coat of arms of Baden) impaling Azure a plowshare argent. The town's seal shows the same, and dates to 1458.

=== Twin cities ===
Denzlingen is twinned with four European cities:

- In 1974 with the French town Saint-Cyr-sur-Mer which is on the Côte d'Azur in Provence
- In 1988 with the English town of North Hykeham in Lincolnshire
- In 1993 with the Italian town of Città della Pieve in Umbria
- In 2011 with the Polish town of Konstancin-Jeziorna in Masovian Voivodeship

== Personalities ==
- Maximilian Heidenreich (born 1967), former footballer, lived in Denzlingen.
- Mike Kluge (born 1962), cyclist and cyclocross world champion 1992, lives in Denzlingen.
- Hanka Kupfernagel (born 1974), German champion, European champion and world champion in cycling, lived in Denzlingen.
