= Heuweiler =

- Municipality
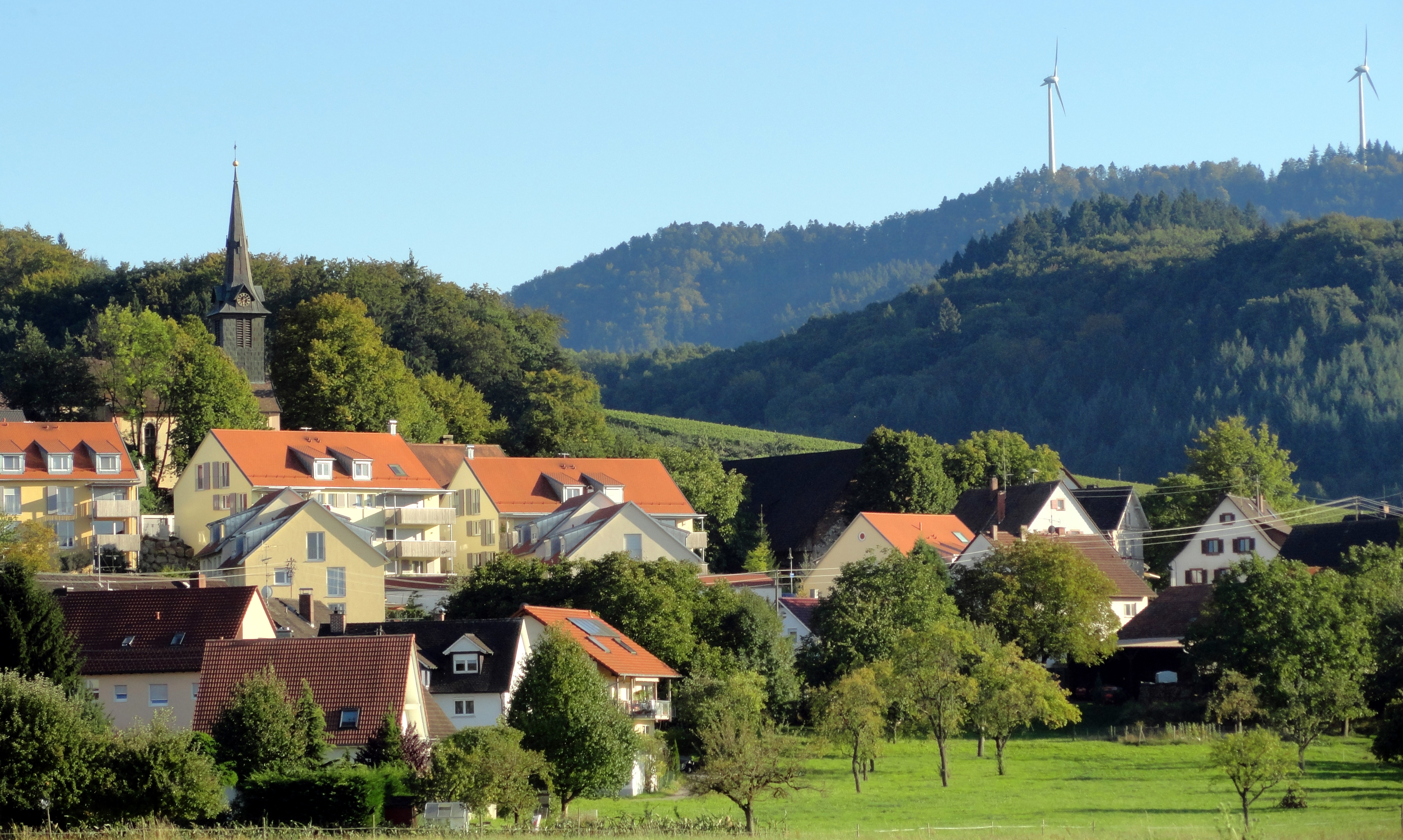
- Heuweiler

- Coat of arms

- Location of Heuweiler within Breisgau-Hochschwarzwald district
- Interactive map of Heuweiler
- Location within Germany Location within Baden-Württemberg
- Coordinates: 48°3′6″N 7°54′11″E
- Country: Germany
- State: Baden-Württemberg
- Admin. region: Freiburg
- District: Breisgau-Hochschwarzwald

Government
  - Mayor (2015–23): Raphael Walz

Area
  - Total: 4.03 km^{2} (1.56 sq mi)
- Elevation: 268 m (879 ft)

Population (2025-12-31)
  - Total: 1,149
  - Density: 285/km^{2} (738/sq mi)
- Time zone: UTC+01:00 (CET)
  - Summer (DST): UTC+02:00 (CEST)
- Postal codes: 79194
- Dialling codes: 07666
- Vehicle registration: FR
- Website: www.heuweiler.de

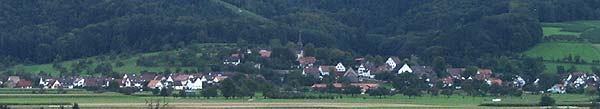
View from the direction of Denzlingen

Heuweiler is a village in the district of Breisgau-Hochschwarzwald in the southwest of Baden-Württemberg near Freiburg in southern Germany.

The village has to a large extent retained its rural character. Whereas many communities in the vicinity of Freiburg have grown rapidly in recent decades a slow, organic change occurred in Heuweiler.

== Geography ==
Heuweiler is located at the mouth of the Glotter valley in the Rhine Valley. The municipality consists of the village Vorderheuweiler, the hamlet Hinterheuweiler, the tine Neuhäuser and the farms and Berghäusle and Litzelstahlerhof.

In the west Gundelfingen borders on Heuweiler, in the east the village Glottertal, both in the district Breisgau-Hochschwarzwald, the neighboring municipality in the north, Denzlingen, is located in the district Emmendingen.

== History ==
Since its beginnings, the history of the village was connected that of the city of Freiburg. For instance, the farmers of Heuweiler had to perform socage and transport the sandstone of Tennenbach which was used for building the Minster. When Freiburg was ruled by the Habsburgs it became part of Further Austria. Heuweiler became part of the bailiwick Kastelburg-Schwarzenberg. Still today old border stones remind of the district boundaries of that time.

=== Religion ===
The parish church was mentioned for the first time in documents in 1275. It is dedicated to Saint Remigius. Heuweiler remained until very recently a predominantly catholic village. Only since the population influx in recent decades also inhabitants of other confessions and faiths reside in the village.

=== Population Development ===
Year	Inhabitants	Year	Inhabitants
1852	327	1970	698
1875	409	1980	806
1900	363	1987	817
1933	363	1990	932
1950	525	2000	1010
1960	612	2005	1006

== Politics ==
Heuweiler is one of the smallest autonomous villages of the district Breisgau-Hochschwarzwald. Its independence has been preserved by the municipal association with the neighboring municipality Gundelfingen. Dr. Reinhard Bentler is in personal union the mayor of both communities.

=== Municipal council ===
The local elections on 7 June 2009 with a voter turnout of 68.9% had the following result:

FWG (Free Voters)	45,33 %	5 seats	+ 1
New List	30,34 %	3 seats	– 1
Women's List	24,33 %	2 seats	± 0

=== Coat of arms ===
The coat of arms shows a pitchfork crossed by a rake. Nevertheless, the placename has nothing to do with "Heu" (hay), but is the written high German form of the old name "Hainwiller" (grove hamlet), meaning "village in the grove" or in the "Hau" (cut forest).

== Economy and infrastructure ==
=== Economy ===
Heuweiler was originally primarily dominated by agriculture. Today there are only a few full-time farming businesses and a small number of independent handicraft businesses left. On the other hand, tourism and gastronomy are flourishing. However, a large number of its inhabitants commutes to Freiburg or one of the surrounding villages for work.

=== School ===
An elementary school exists in the village. However, it is very small. Therefore, the pupils from Heuweiler attend the elementary school in Gundelfingen. In return, every year two or three third grades of the Johann Peter Hebel elementary school in Gundelfingen are outsourced to Heuweiler. Secondary schools can be found in Denzlingen, Gundelfingen and Freiburg.

== Culture and attractions ==
Worth seeing is the baroque church St.Remigius which is visible from a distance. In it there are two precious altar paintings.

== People ==
- Joseph Dettlinger (1865–1937), sculptor, was born in Heuweiler.
