= Roßkopfturm =

Coordinates: 48°0′37″N 7°54′6″E

The Roßkopf tower (actually Friedrichsturm or Frederick's tower after Frederick I, Grand Duke of Baden) is a 34.4 m (113 ft) high observation tower of steel frame structure commissioned and financed by the Schwarzwaldverein (Black Forest Club) and built by the Freiburg architect Philipp Anton Lazy in 1889 on the 737 m (2,418 ft) high Roßkopf near Freiburg between the Dreisam valley and the Glotter valley.

It is one of the oldest steel lattice towers in Germany. Panoramic views of the Black Forest and the Rhine Valley can be seen from the observation platform above the treetops of the wooded hilltop, and in good visibility to the south until the Alps and the west the Kaiserstuhl and the Vosges.

== Postcards ==
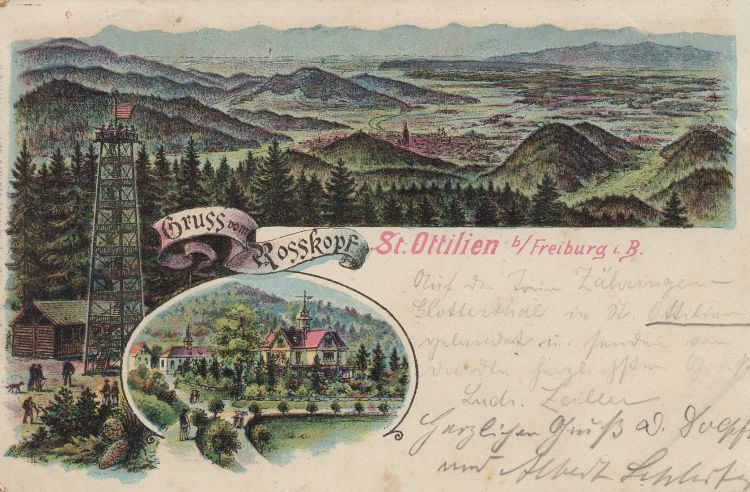
1900

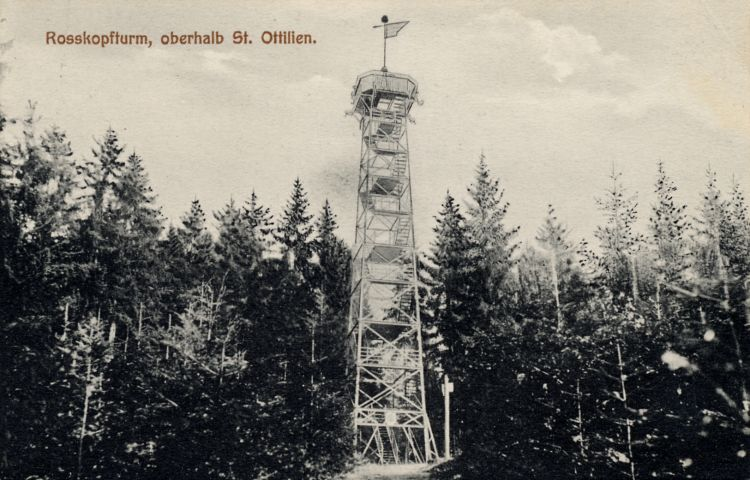
1905

== Photos ==
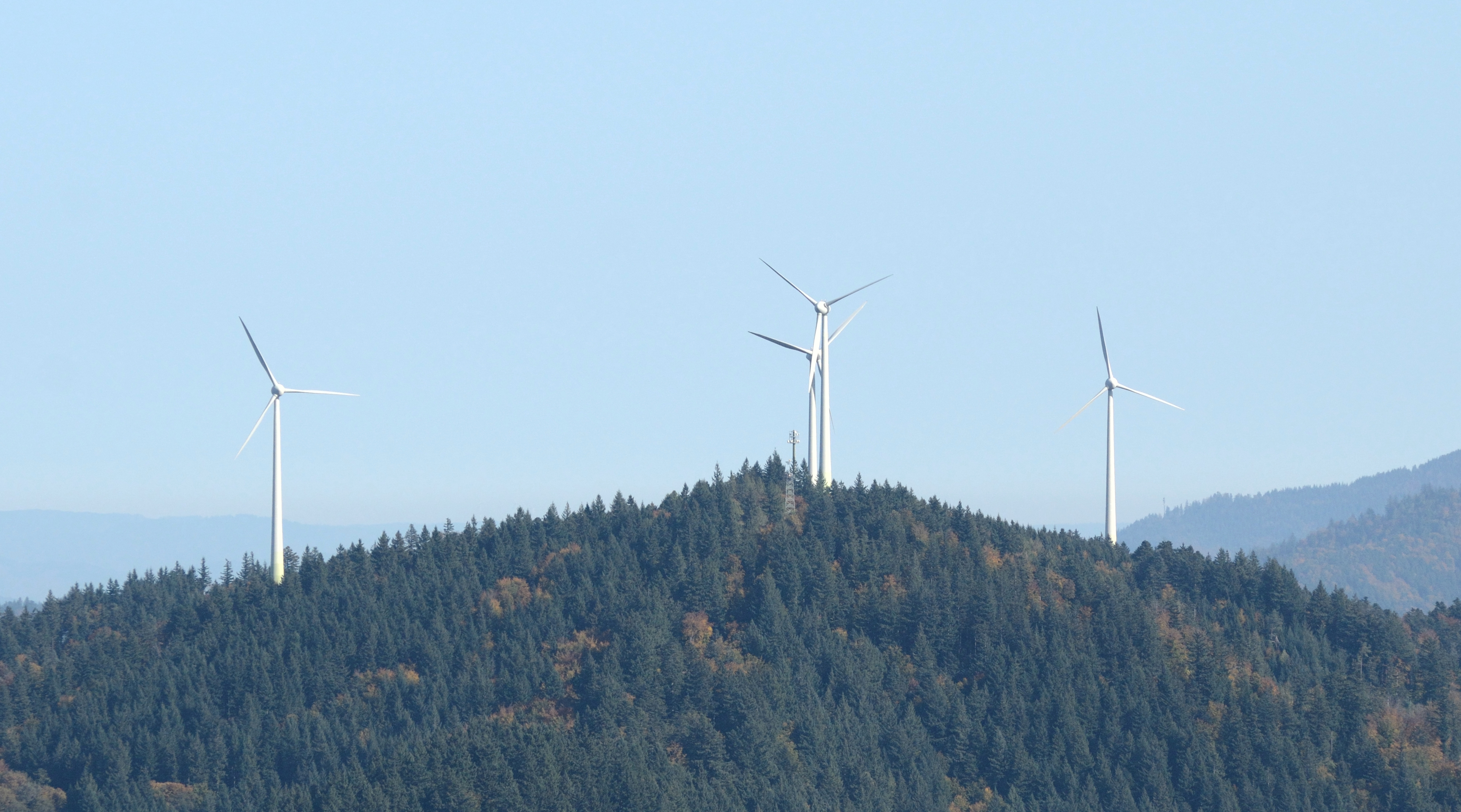
Tower to the left of the two turbines in the center

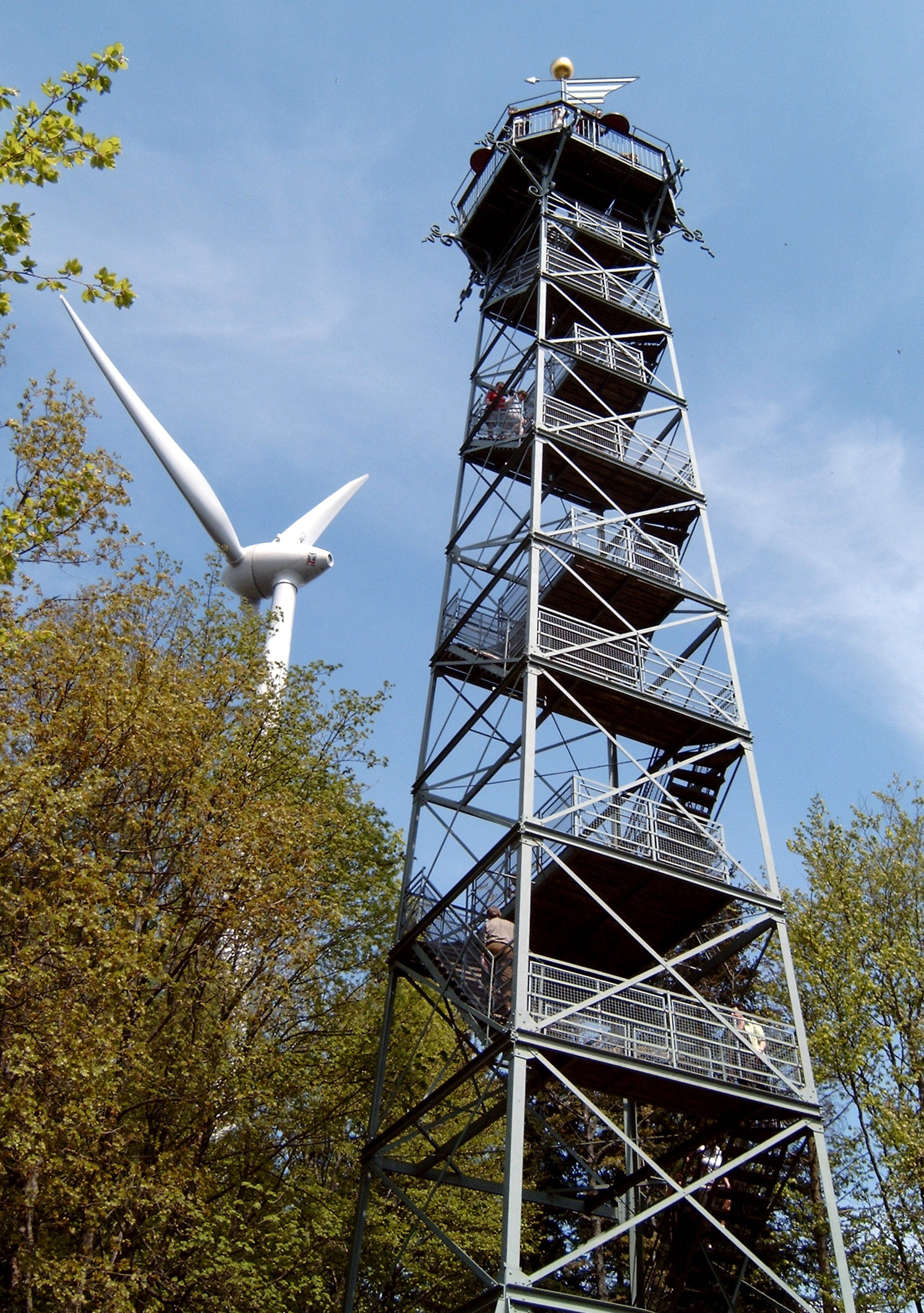
Tower with wind turbine

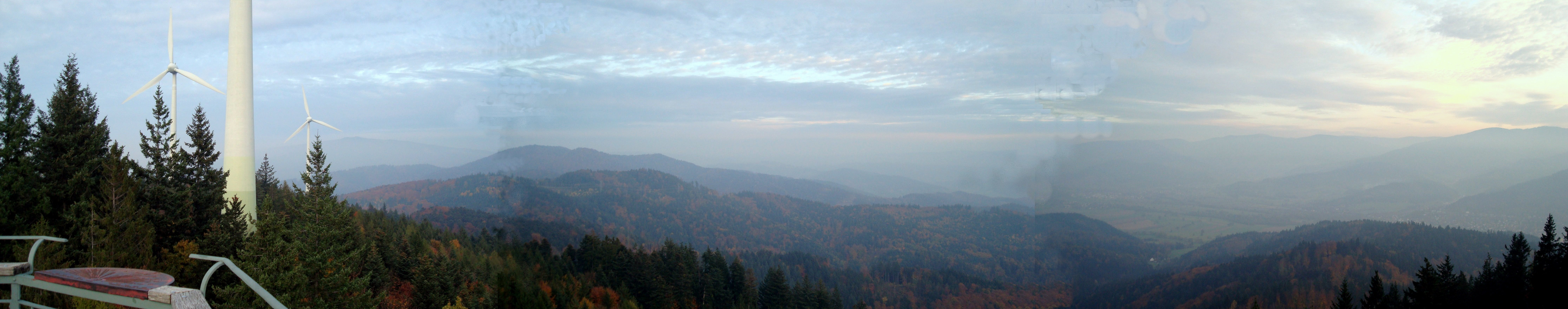
View from above
