= Karl-Heinz Tritschler =

German football referee

- Born: 16 September 1949 (age 77); Vörstetten, West Germany
- Other occupation: Clerk

Domestic
Years	League	Role
1980–1991	Bundesliga	Referee

International
Years	League	Role
1983–1991	FIFA-listed	Referee

Karl-Heinz Tritschler (born 16 September 1949 in Vörstetten) is a former football referee from Germany. He is known for having officiated at the 1988 Summer Olympics, and the 1989 European Cup Final between AC Milan and Steaua București.
