= Roßkopf (Breisgau) =

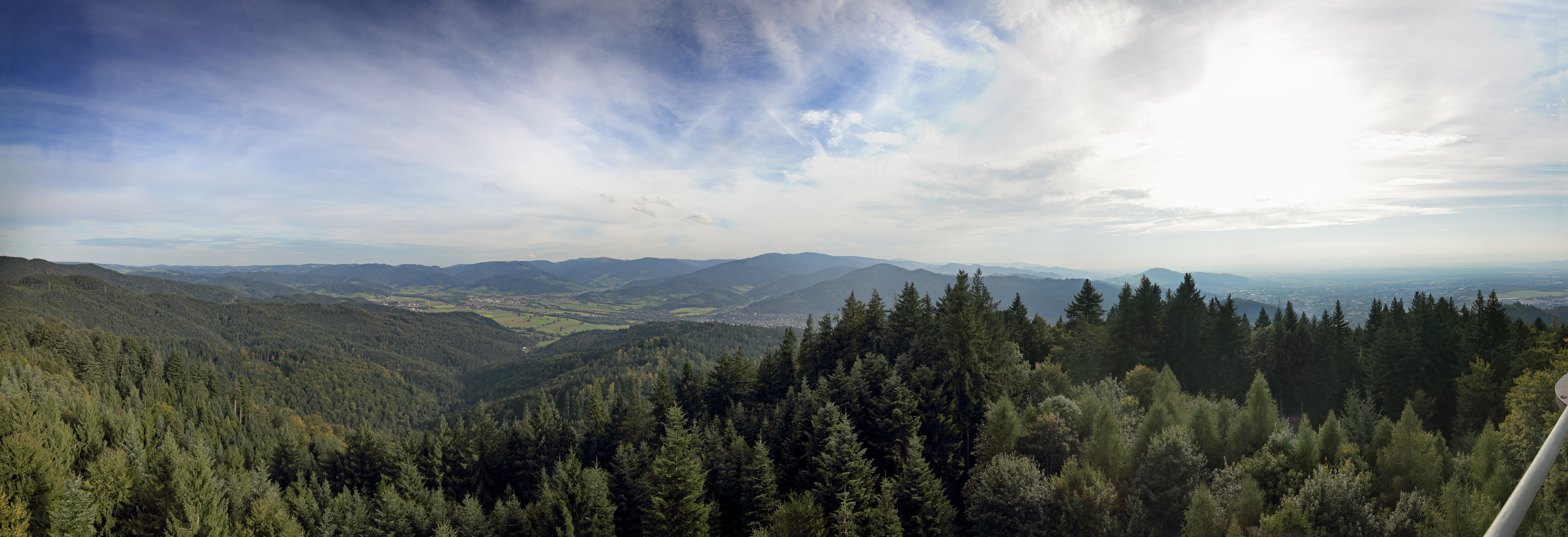
- View from the Roßkopf

Highest point
- Elevation: 737 m (2,418 ft)
- Coordinates: 48°00′37″N 07°54′06″E

Naming
- English translation: Horsehead
- Language of name: German

Geography
- Location within Baden-Württemberg
- Location: Baden-Württemberg, Germany
- Parent range: Black Forest

Roßkopf (Breisgau) is a mountain of Baden-Württemberg, Germany.

The 737 m (2,418 ft) high Rosskopf is a mountain in the Black Forest in the northeast of Freiburg and the southeast of Gundelfingen. It is on the edge of the territory of the city between the Glotter valley and the Dreisam valley. On the Roßkopf the borders of Gundelfingen, Freiburg and the formerly independent municipality Ebnet (today Freiburg-Ebnet) meet. Several border stones in the forest give evidence of the development of the municipal boundaries.

== Trails ==
The section of the Kandel trail from Sankt Peter, Baden-Württemberg to Freiburg crosses the mountain. The Rosskopf is a mountain for mountain bikers (part of the mountain bike trail [1]) and easy to reach from Freiburg and the surrounding villages. Only some of the trails have been released for cyclists and parts of the forest on the Roßkopf are under special protection as protected forest. Below the tower on the Roßkopf is the starting point for an approximately two miles long downhill trail that starts on the Rosskopf and leads to the youth hostel of Freiburg.

== Martinsfelsen ==
To the north of the summit of the Roßkopf lies the Martinsfelsen, a rock at an altitude of 686 m (2,251 ft), which offers a view of the Northern Breisgau.

== Roßkopfturm ==
At its summit and next to a small hut is the Roßkopf tower (Roßkopfturm or Friedrichsturm), a 115 ft high observation tower of steel frame structure which was built in 1889 and offers a panoramic view of Freiburg, the Kaiserstuhl mountain range and the surrounding mountains.

== Wind turbines ==
In 2003, four wind turbines were installed on the Rosskopf by the enterprise Regiowind GmbH, each with a capacity of 1.8 MW, and new access roads were created. The turbines of the type Enercon E66/18.70 that were taken into operation in November 2003 have a hub height of 98 m (322 ft) and a rotor diameter of 70 m (230 ft), thus a total height of 133 m (436 ft). Together with the two other wind turbines on the Holzschlägermatte on the Schauinsland they produced over 12 million kilowatt hours of energy in 2010 which corresponds to the requirement of 5400 households.

== Photos ==
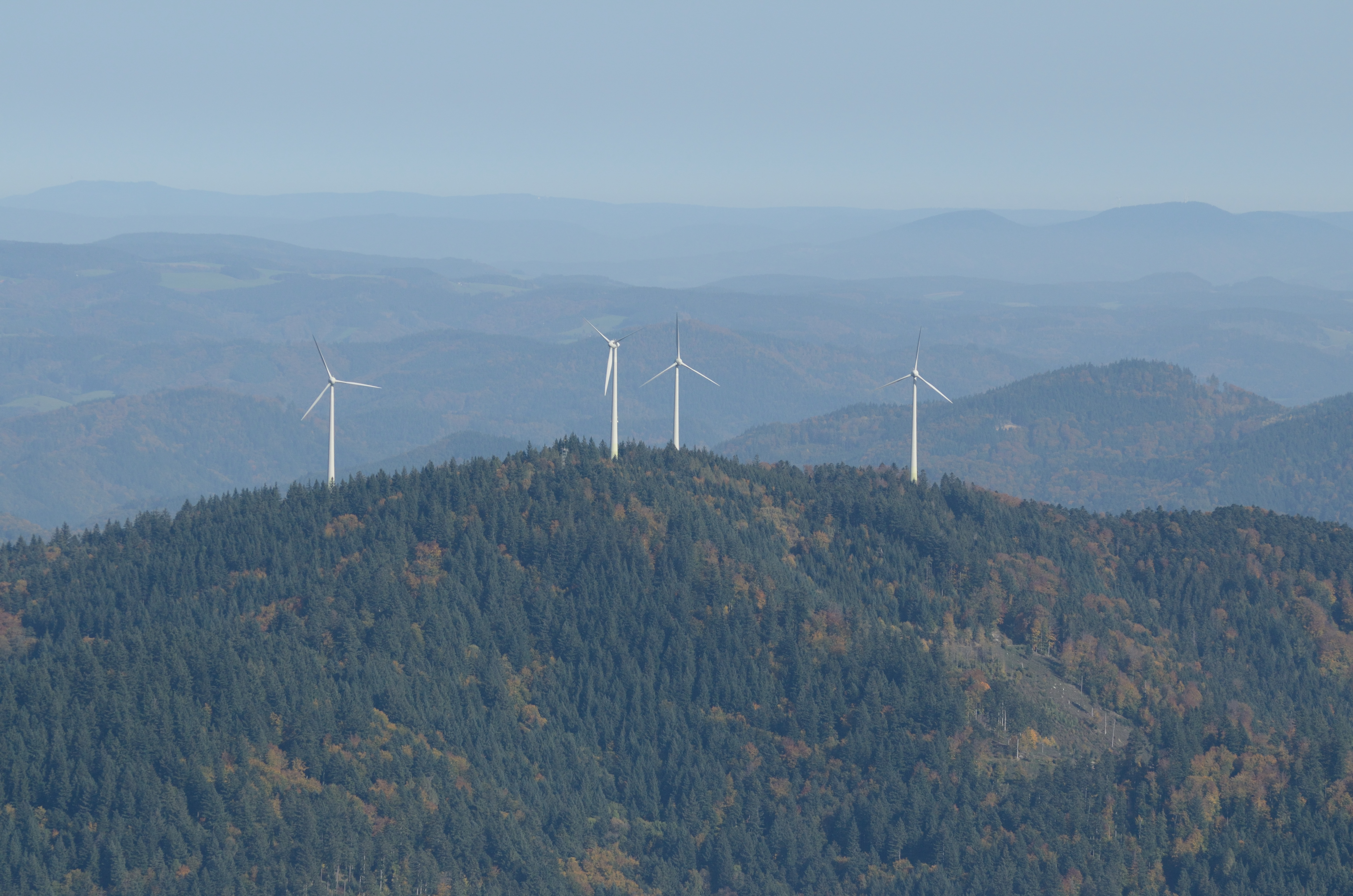
From the air

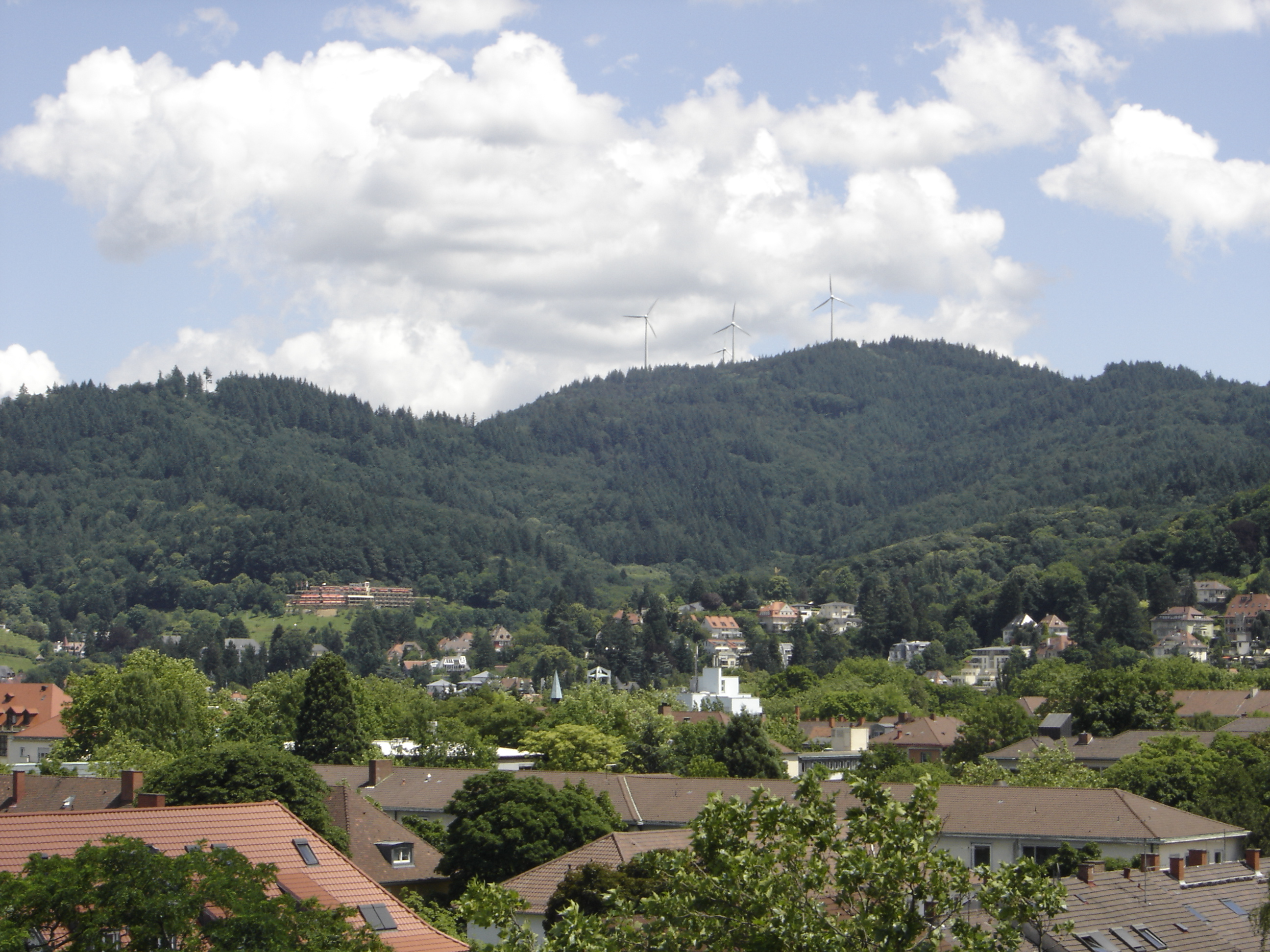
From the west
