= Gottenheim =

Independent village in the state of Baden-Württemberg, Germany

- Municipality
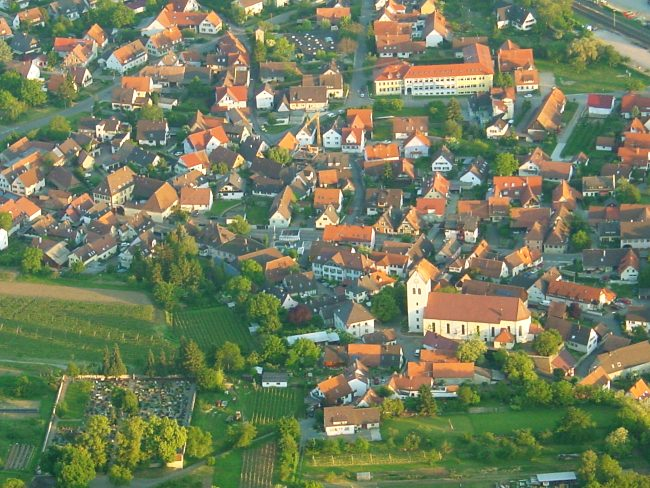
- Aerial view

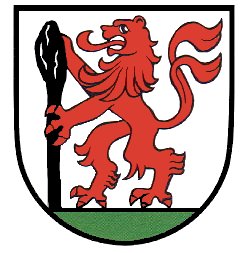
- Coat of arms

- Location of Gottenheim within Breisgau-Hochschwarzwald district
- Interactive map of Gottenheim
- Location within Germany Location within Baden-Württemberg
- Coordinates: 48°02′59″N 07°43′44″E
- Country: Germany
- State: Baden-Württemberg
- Admin. region: Freiburg
- District: Breisgau-Hochschwarzwald

Government
  - Mayor (2022–30): Christian Riesterer

Area
  - Total: 8.74 km^{2} (3.37 sq mi)
- Elevation: 207 m (679 ft)

Population (2025-12-31)
  - Total: 3,173
  - Density: 363/km^{2} (940/sq mi)
- Time zone: UTC+01:00 (CET)
  - Summer (DST): UTC+02:00 (CEST)
- Postal codes: 79288
- Dialling codes: 07665
- Vehicle registration: FR
- Website: www.gottenheim.de

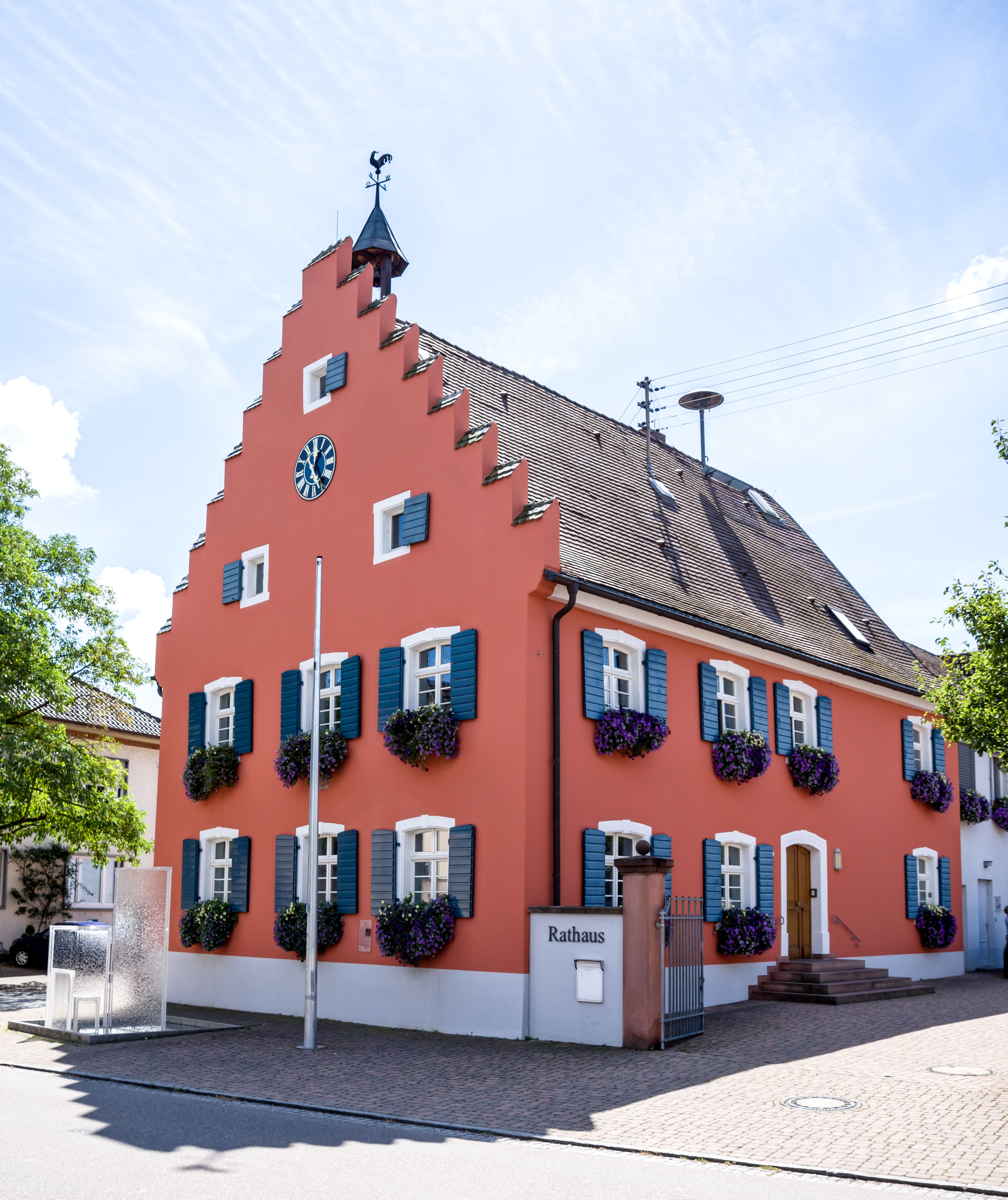
town-hall

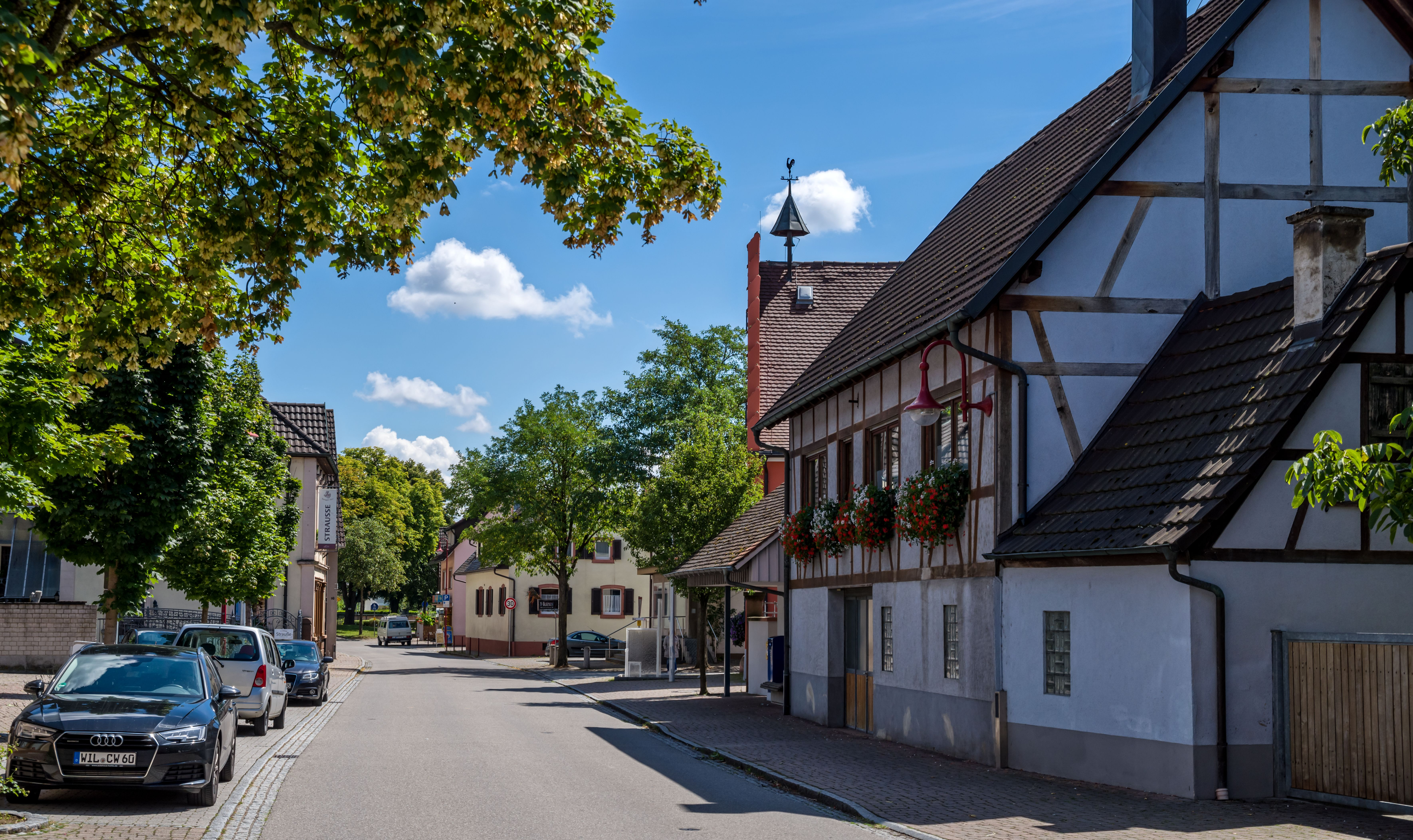
View into the town

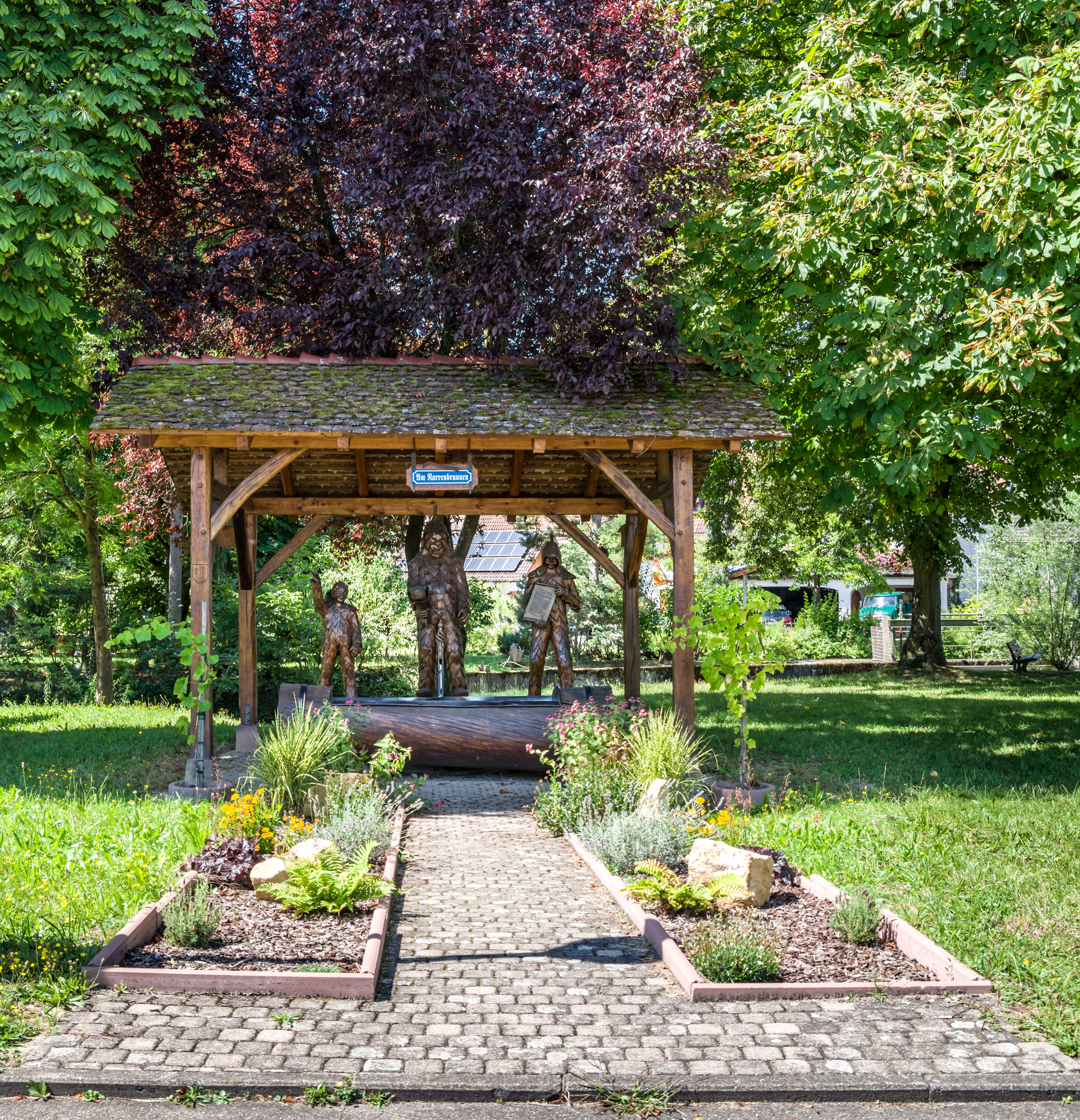
Fool's Fountain in Gottenheim

Gottenheim is an independent village at the northern tip of the Tuniberg, 15 km west of Freiburg im Breisgau. It is located in the administrative region Breisgau-Hochschwarzwald in the federal state of Baden-Württemberg, Germany.

Situated at an altitude of 207 m in one of the warmest regions of Germany, Gottenheim has a population of 2,912.

The total area of Gottenheim is 2183 acres (8.83 km^{2}), which includes 275 acres (1.11 km^{2}) of vines, 538 acres (2.18 km^{2}) alluvial forest and some acres of half-bog.

== History ==
Gottenheim was first officially mentioned in 1086.

== Economy and Infrastructure ==
The Breisgau S-Bahn operated Breisachbahn railway line connects Gottenheim station to Breisach in the west and the national railway system (Deutsche Bahn) via Freiburg im Breisgau in the east. The Kaiserstuhlbahn connects Gottenheim to Endingen and the towns, Riegel am Kaiserstuhl, Nimburg and Bötzingen, which lay in between.

By car Gottenheim can be reached via German Autobahn A5, Frankfurt-Basel, using exit No.62 Freiburg-Mitte towards Umkirch and following signs.

== Culture and sights ==
=== Festivals ===
- Gottenheim Hahlerai-fest (local wine and food festival) every second year in autumn
