= Reute (Breisgau) =

German municipality

- Municipality
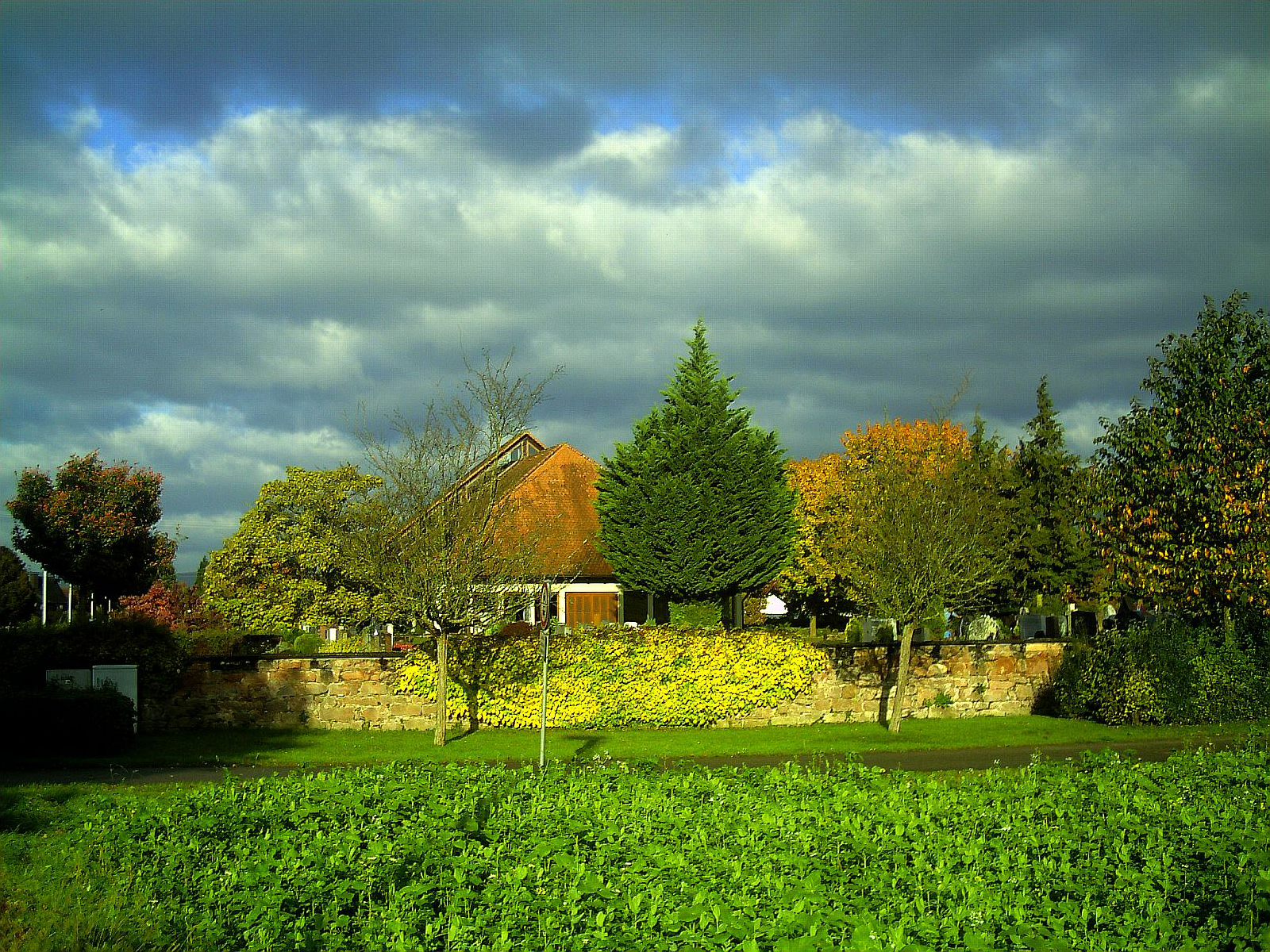
- Reute, October 2013

- Coat of arms

- Location of Reute within Emmendingen district
- Interactive map of Reute
- Location within Germany Location within Baden-Württemberg
- Coordinates: 48°5′0″N 7°49′32″E
- Country: Germany
- State: Baden-Württemberg
- Admin. region: Freiburg
- District: Emmendingen
- Subdivisions: 2

Area
  - Total: 4.79 km^{2} (1.85 sq mi)
- Elevation: 205 m (673 ft)

Population (2025-12-31)
  - Total: 3,005
  - Density: 627/km^{2} (1,620/sq mi)
- Time zone: UTC+01:00 (CET)
  - Summer (DST): UTC+02:00 (CEST)
- Postal codes: 79276
- Dialling codes: 07641
- Vehicle registration: EM
- Website: www.reute.de

Reute (German pronunciation: [ˈʁɔʏtə]) is a municipality in the district of Emmendingen in Baden-Württemberg, Germany.

== History ==
Evidence of human habitation in the area of Reute date back to Neolithic and Bronze Age, between 2300 and 800 BC. Celtic grave mounds and their goods, from the Hallstatt culture and dated to around 750 BC, were found in the municipal area.

Upper and Lower Reute were possessions of the Landgraviate of Breisgau until they were mediatized to the Grand Duchy of Baden in 1805. They were assigned to Oberamt Freiburg in 1809 and then to the district of Emmendingen in 1819. In 1939, that district was reorganized into the present district of Emmendingen.

== Geography ==
The municipality (Gemeinde) of Reute is the smallest in Emmendingen district of Baden-Württemberg, one of the 16 states of the Federal Republic of Germany. It is physically located in the Upper Rhine valley, at the northern extremity of the Freiburger Bucht.

The township of Reute rests on an alluvial fan ridge and has historically been divided into Upper and Lower Reute. The Glotter river flows below the ridge to its immediate south.

== Coat of arms ==
Reute's coat of arms displays that of Austria, impaled with a field of blue that houses a yellow plowshare. The pattern references the period of rule of Reute by the Austrian Habsburgs, and to Reute itself, as the plowshare is a motif of the town dating back to 17th century town seals. This pattern was devised by the Karlsruhe General State Archives in 1906 and subsequently adopted by Reute's municipal council. It was not approved for official use until 24 April 1989, when the Emmendingen district office extended that approval and issued a municipal flag.
