= Breisgau-Hochschwarzwald =

Coordinates: 47.95°N 7.85°E

Breisgau-Hochschwarzwald Brisgau-Haute-Forêt-Noire (French)
- District
- Flag Coat of arms
- Country: Germany
- State: Baden-Württemberg
- Adm. region: Freiburg
- Capital: Freiburg

Government
  - District admin.: Christian Ante

Area
  - Total: 1,378.4 km^{2} (532.2 sq mi)

Population (31 December 2023)
  - Total: 271,977
  - Density: 197.31/km^{2} (511.04/sq mi)
- Time zone: UTC+01:00 (CET)
  - Summer (DST): UTC+02:00 (CEST)
- Vehicle registration: FR
- Website: breisgau-hochschwarzwald.de

Breisgau-Hochschwarzwald (French: Arrondissement de Brisgau-Haute-Forêt-Noire) is a Landkreis (district) in the southwest of Baden-Württemberg, Germany. Fifty towns and municipalities with 133 settlements lie within the district. The district itself belongs to the region of Freiburg with the region of Southern Upper Rhine.

The municipal offices are in the city of Freiburg im Breisgau which is almost entirely surrounded by Breisgau-Hochschwarzwald, but is independent of it. In addition, the council has three satellite offices in Müllheim, Titisee-Neustadt and Breisach am Rhein.

== Geography ==
=== Location ===
Breisgau-Hochschwarzwald covers areas which are very different in scenic character: in the Upper Rhine Plain are the Markgräflerland and its foothill zone, which is continued north of the Breisgau with the hills of Kaiserstuhl, the Tuniberg and the Nimberg.

Within the district, the Black Forest covers the side valleys opening onto the Rhine Plain - the Glottertal, the valley of the Dreisam, the Höllental and the Münstertal - the High Black Forest with its highest peak, the Feldberg (1493 m), and extends as far as the plateau of Baar.

In the centre of Breisgau-Hochschwarzwald lies the territory of the city of Freiburg, which is almost entirely surrounded by Breisgau-Hochschwarzwald. Only on its northern side is there a 3-kilometre-long boundary with the municipality of Vörstetten and the district of Emmendingen.

=== Neighbouring counties ===
The neighbouring counties are Emmendingen, Schwarzwald-Baar, Waldshut, Lörrach and the French départements of the Haut-Rhin and the Bas-Rhin. The independent city of Freiburg is surrounded by the district. The district is named after the Breisgau, a historical territory, and the High Black Forest (Hochschwarzwald).

=== Climate ===
The climate in Breisgau-Hochschwarzwald is very varied. Between Ihringen, the place with the highest annual average temperature in Germany, and the summit of the Feldberg, both the warmest and the coldest places in Baden-Württemberg lie in Breisgau-Hochschwarzwald. Climatically, the district is one of the warmest regions in Germany: its mean annual temperature in the Rhine valley is 11 °C (52 °F), its average rainfall is approximately 900 mm (35 in), and it has about 1,800 hours of sunshine annually. Moreover, the highest temperature ever measured in Germany, 40.2 °C (104.4 °F), was recorded on 13 August 2003 in the municipality of March. March shares this record with Gärmersdorf near Amberg, Freiburg and Karlsruhe.

== History ==
The County of Breisgau (Grafschaft Breisgau) and County of Baar (Grafschaft Baar) were formed on the territory of the present district in the 8th century. Both counties belonged to the Duchy of Alemannia. The eastern part, the upper reaches of the Danube and Neckar, came under the Carolingian dominion of the Ahalolfings. Following the disintegration of the Frankish Empire in 843, the area became part of East Francia and part of it, from 920, the Duchy of Swabia. In 1368, the Breisgau went into the hands of the House of Habsburg (see Anterior Austria). The Swabian princes of Fürstenberg dominated the Baar, while the area south of Freiburg, the Markgräflerland, ended up with the margraves of Baden. In 1805/06, after the end of the Napoleonic Wars, the region became part of the Grand Duchy of Baden.

The district of Breisgau-Hochschwarzwald was established as part of the district reform of Baden-Württemberg on 1 Jan 1973, mainly from the former rural districts of Freiburg, Müllheim and Hochschwarzwald (with its head office in Neustadt in the Black Forest). In addition, the municipality of Unadingen from the district of Donaueschingen was incorporated. Other municipalities were integrated into the city of Freiburg. The southern part of the district of Müllheim went to Lörrach and some municipalities were transferred from the old district of Hochschwarzwald to Waldshut.

Later, more municipalities were incorporated into the city of Freiburg: Munzingen on 1 July 1973, Hochdorf on 1 September 1973 and Ebnet and Kappel on 1 July 1974. On 1 September 1973, the municipality of Schönenbach, which belonged to the district of Waldshut, was added. On 1 January 1974 Kiechlinsbergen was ceded to Emmendingen. On 1 April 1974 Leiselheim followed. On 18 March 1975 Grünwald was added from the district of Waldshut was added (moving from Bonndorf im Schwarzwald to Lenzkirch).

The three old districts were formed in 1939 from the Amtbezirke of the same name that had been established in the early nineteenth century when large numbers of them were formed as the area became part of Baden. In the course of the history the Amtsbezirke were changed several times, until in 1936 only those of Freiburg, Müllheim, Neustadt im Schwarzwald and Staufen were left. Staufen was divided between Freiburg and Müllheim. The district of Neustadt, founded in 1939, was renamed Hochschwarzwald in 1956.

Following the completion of the municipal form, the district of Breisgau-Hochschwarzwald comprised 50 municipalities, including ten towns. There are no large county towns. The largest town is Müllheim, the smallest municipality is Heuweiler. The most recent town is Bad Krozingen (from 1 September 2005).

== Population growth ==
The population figures are based on censuses (1987) or official updates by the Baden-Württemberg State Office of Statistics (only main residences).

Date	Population
31 December 1973	181,335
31 December 1975	187,104
31 December 1980	199,911
31 December 1985	207,466
25 May 1987	203,111

Date	Population
31 December 1990	217,267
31 December 1995	230,839
31 December 2000	240,545
31 December 2005	249,535
31 December 2010	251,266
31 December 2015	257,334

== Economy ==
The economy is based on tourism, wine, and forestry.

== Politics ==
Politically, the majority of the district parliament (Kreistag) is traditionally conservative (CDU), with higher levels of conservative votes the farther the distance from Freiburg (which has a green-red majority).

== Coat of arms ==
The left half of the coat of arms show the colors of Austria, and the right side the colors of Baden, as parts of the District belonged to both states at various times. In the middle, the coat of arms shows an eagle, taken from the coat of arms of the Princes of Fürstenberg. The coat of arms was granted in 1974, and it is very similar to the coat of arms of the previous Freiburg district.

== Cities and municipalities ==
Clickable map of towns and municipalities in the district

Cities
1. Bad Krozingen; 2. Breisach; 3. Heitersheim; 4. Löffingen; 5. Müllheim; 6. Neuenburg am Rhein; 7. Staufen im Breisgau; 8. Sulzburg; 9. Titisee-Neustadt; 10. Vogtsburg	7. Breitnau; 8. Buchenbach; 9. Buggingen; 10. Ebringen; 11. Ehrenkirchen; 12. Eichstetten am Kaiserstuhl; 13. Eisenbach; 14. Eschbach; 15. Feldberg; 16. Friedenweiler; 17. Glottertal; 18. Gottenheim; 19. Gundelfingen; 20. Hartheim; 21. Heuweiler; 22. Hinterzarten; 23. Horben; 24. Ihringen; 25. Kirchzarten	26. Lenzkirch; 27. March; 28. Merdingen; 29. Merzhausen; 30. Münstertal; 31. Oberried; 32. Pfaffenweiler; 33. Schallstadt; 34. Schluchsee; 35. Sölden; 36. Sankt Märgen; 37. Sankt Peter; 38. Stegen; 39. Umkirch; 40. Wittnau
Municipalities	7. Breitnau; 8. Buchenbach; 9. Buggingen; 10. Ebringen; 11. Ehrenkirchen; 12. Eichstetten am Kaiserstuhl; 13. Eisenbach; 14. Eschbach; 15. Feldberg; 16. Friedenweiler; 17. Glottertal; 18. Gottenheim; 19. Gundelfingen; 20. Hartheim; 21. Heuweiler; 22. Hinterzarten; 23. Horben; 24. Ihringen; 25. Kirchzarten	26. Lenzkirch; 27. March; 28. Merdingen; 29. Merzhausen; 30. Münstertal; 31. Oberried; 32. Pfaffenweiler; 33. Schallstadt; 34. Schluchsee; 35. Sölden; 36. Sankt Märgen; 37. Sankt Peter; 38. Stegen; 39. Umkirch; 40. Wittnau
1. Au; 2. Auggen; 3. Badenweiler; 4. Ballrechten-Dottingen; 5. Bötzingen; 6. Bollschweil	7. Breitnau; 8. Buchenbach; 9. Buggingen; 10. Ebringen; 11. Ehrenkirchen; 12. Eichstetten am Kaiserstuhl; 13. Eisenbach; 14. Eschbach; 15. Feldberg; 16. Friedenweiler; 17. Glottertal; 18. Gottenheim; 19. Gundelfingen; 20. Hartheim; 21. Heuweiler; 22. Hinterzarten; 23. Horben; 24. Ihringen; 25. Kirchzarten	26. Lenzkirch; 27. March; 28. Merdingen; 29. Merzhausen; 30. Münstertal; 31. Oberried; 32. Pfaffenweiler; 33. Schallstadt; 34. Schluchsee; 35. Sölden; 36. Sankt Märgen; 37. Sankt Peter; 38. Stegen; 39. Umkirch; 40. Wittnau
