= Dreisam =

River in Germany

Coordinates: 47°59′N 7°50′E

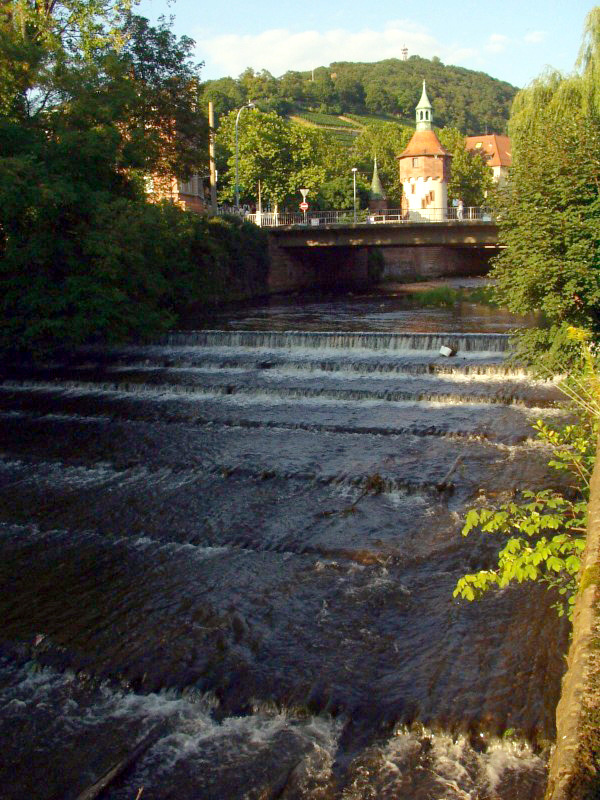
- Freiburg im Breisgau downstream of the Schwabentor Bridge (August 2005)

Location
- Country: Germany
- State: Baden-Württemberg
- Region: Black Forest
- Districts: Breisgau-Hochschwarzwald and Emmendingen
- Municipalities: Freiburg im Breisgau; Kirchzarten; March; Riegel am Kaiserstuhl; Stegen

Physical characteristics
- Source confluence: Rotbach and Wagensteinbach
  - location: Kirchzarten, Germany
  - elevation: 377 m (1,237 ft)
- Mouth: Elz
  - location: Riegel am Kaiserstuhl, Germany
  - elevation: 178 m (584 ft)
- Length: 29 km (18 mi)
- Basin size: 577 km^{2} (223 sq mi)

Basin features
- Progression: Elz→ Rhine→ North Sea
- Tributaries
  - left: Krumbach, Brugga
  - right: Eschbach, Glotter

The Dreisam (German pronunciation: [ˈdʁaɪzaːm]; Celtic: *tragisamā, "the very fast one") is a 29 km long river (48.8 km including its source river Rotbach), and a tributary of the Elz in the German state of Baden-Württemberg. The waters of the Dreisam feed the famous Freiburg Bächle runnels.

== Geography ==
The Dreisam begins in the Dreisam Valley (Dreisamtal) which is located in the Southern Black Forest (Südschwarzwald). The origin of the river can be found close to a bridge on the Landesstraße 127 which leads from Kirchzarten to Stegen. Here, two streams, the Rotbach and Wagensteinbach, meet to form the Dreisam river. This confluence is located in the western part of the Southern Black Forest Nature Park below the so-called Höllental, where the Rotchbach flows through, and the Wagensteig valley. From there on the Dreisam, which was canalized, flows towards the west and reaches Freiburg at the eastern end of Ebnet. Along the way the Dreisam meets the Krummbach and Brugga, two streams originating south of the Dreisam, as well as the Eschbach stream which flows north of the Dreisam. The river leaves the Black Forest at the Freiburg soccer stadium called Schwarzwald-Stadion and continues flowing westwards. In the eastern part of the city, water is withdrawn from the river at Sandfang. It is used to supply the Gewerbekanal, an industrial canal, and the famous Freiburg Bächle with water. A division of the river into a northern and southern branch takes place in the historic city center. The majority of the southern branch flows back into the Dreisam directly west of the Höllentalbahnbrücke bridge which is located in the Stühlinger district. The remaining water runs through the areas Eschholz and Bischofslinde towards the west and ultimately flows back into the Dreisam near Lehen.

The northern branch of the river runs often subterraneously through the northwestern historic center of the districts Beurbarung and Brühl and flows westwards of Gundelfingen into Schobbach. Schobbach then again leads into the Glotter at Nimburg-Bottingen. As a result, the Freiburger Bächlewasser flows into the Dreisam only shortly before Riegel. In the urban area of Freiburg, the Dreisam itself runs in northwestern direction along the B31. After crossing under the A5 the river flows through March, at the eastern edge of the Kaiserstuhl as well as the western edge of Nimberg towards Riegel, where it leads into the Elz. From 1817 to 1842 the Dreisam was canalized in its whole length from Kirchzarten to Riegel under the leadership of Johann Gottfried Tulla. However it should be renaturalized in the east of Freiburg at a length of 800m. It overcomes 199m height, from Kirchzarten (337m NHN) until its mouth into the Elz (178m) at Riegel. 135m above or southwards of the river mouth the Glotter leads into the Dreisam, coming from south-southeastern. Northeastern of St. Michaelsberg (241 m NHN), the Alte Dreisam, from south-southwestern, flows into the direct mouth of Dreisam and Elz.

== Floods ==
The 15 km long Leopoldskanal branches off right below the confluence of the earlier mentioned Elz. This canal is used to drain water to the Rhine if the Dreisam has high-water. The canal ends north-west of Rheinhausen, south-west of Rust and west of the Naturschutzgebiet Taubergießen. The Dreisam's catchment area is especially prone to flooding due to the steep topography and the climatically and orographically high precipitation. From the Feldberg to the Pegel Ebnet the average slope is at 21° or rather 43% downhill grade. Because of its round shape the area has a high aspect ratio of 0.7 and a high circularity ratio of 0.55 which leads to temporal runoff concentration and thus can quickly lead to flooding. The aquifer, which consists primarily of solid rock, absorbs little water and hence leads to quick drainage, particularly in cases of heavy rainfall. Because of melting snow and heavy rainfalls in spring, the maximum amount of draining water runs off in April. Even though the heaviest rainfalls occur in summer, the high water consumption of the local vegetation only leads to secondary drainage maximums.

In March 1896 a historic flood killed two people and destroyed several bridges. Among the people that were killed was Carl Siegel, a German jurist. Nowadays floods do usually not cause major damages since the Dreisam was secured on both sides through walls and channelized from Freiburg onward. However, on December 23, 1991 there was a flood that caused damage in the eastern part of Freiburg. The riverside paths below the bridges of the Mannheim-Basel-Karlsruhe-railway, called Rheintalbahn in German, are often flooded during high water. Even though warning signs were installed along the path, two cyclists died there in 2010 and 2013 during a flood. In order to prevent accidents like this, the city is planning to install boom gates along the path.

== Drainage basin and tributaries ==
The drainage basin of the Dreisam as far as Riegel covers 568 km². In Germany it is therefore characterized as a drainage basin of medium size. The drainage system of the Dreisam has many branches and can be characterized as a complex first degree river regime which is marked by two major discharges. A maximum discharges can be measured in spring as a result of melting snow. Another major discharge can also be measured in summer or fall depending on when it is raining the most. There are a couple of rivers that coalesce with the Dreisam, which are the headwater streams Rotbach and Wagensteigbach and (ordered towards downstream): Krummbach (which is also called Zastler Bach in the upper section), Brugga, Eschbach and Glotter.

== Usage ==
The waters of the Dreisam used to drive mills, yielding energy for industrial establishments like gem grinderies and tanneries. Today there are still small river power stations like at the Sandfang. In the past, people even caught salmon in the Dreisam, today however, the fishery does no longer have any importance. Nowadays, the Dreisam with its bank paths and meadows serves as a recreational spot for taking walks, swimming or barbecueing. The Dreisam is also of significance in the matter of individual traffic since on the south bank there are bikeways and on both sides motorways that lead to the city center of Freiburg and the “Zubringer Mitte” (highway 31a) to Beratzhausen. Since 2011, the Dreisam has also been used as the venue of an annual duck race fund-raiser that starts in Freiburg's city center. Thousands of numbered rubber ducks are tossed into the river and flow a few hundred meters upstream before being fished out again.

== Literature ==
- Lange, Jörg (2007). Die Dreisam – Vergangenheit, Gegenwart und Zukunft. Laori publisher ISBN 978-3-935737-54-8.
