= March, Breisgau =

March
- Municipality
- Coat of arms

- Location of March within Breisgau-Hochschwarzwald district
- Interactive map of March
- Location within Germany Location within Baden-Württemberg
- Coordinates: 48°3′22″N 7°46′55″E
- Country: Germany
- State: Baden-Württemberg
- Admin. region: Freiburg
- District: Breisgau-Hochschwarzwald
- Subdivisions: 4

Government
  - Mayor (2023–31): Helmut Mursa (Ind.)

Area
  - Total: 17.78 km^{2} (6.86 sq mi)
- Elevation: 201 m (659 ft)

Population (2025-12-31)
  - Total: 9,337
  - Density: 525.1/km^{2} (1,360/sq mi)
- Time zone: UTC+01:00 (CET)
  - Summer (DST): UTC+02:00 (CEST)
- Postal codes: 79232
- Dialling codes: 07665
- Vehicle registration: FR
- Website: www.march.de

March is a municipality in the district of Breisgau-Hochschwarzwald in Baden-Württemberg in southern Germany.

== History ==
The four villages of Buchheim, Hugstetten, Neuershausen and Holzhausen merged in 1973 to the new community of March.

== Coat of arms ==
The coat of arms shows on the left side the cross of the Lorsch Abbey and on the right the silver bear of the Abbey of St. Gall in Switzerland. Both abbeys owned land in the area, what is today March.

== Demographics ==
Population development:

Year	Inhabitants
1990	8,042
2001	8,825
2011	8,617
2021	9,269

== Famous inhabitants ==
Konrad Stürtzel von Buchheim (* about 1435, + 1509), was chancellor of Maximilian I of Habsburg

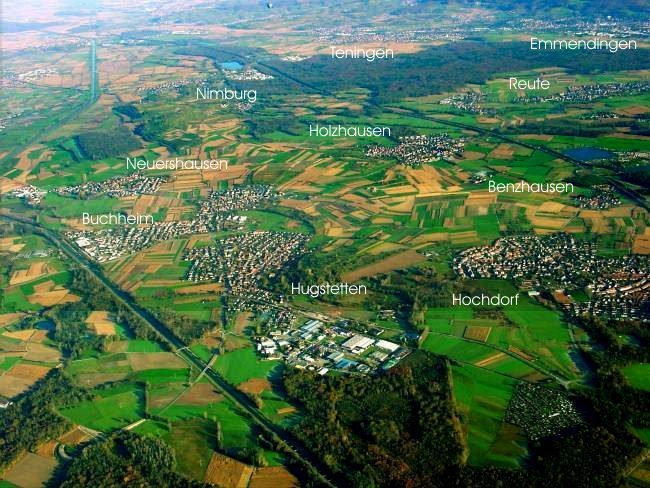
March from the air

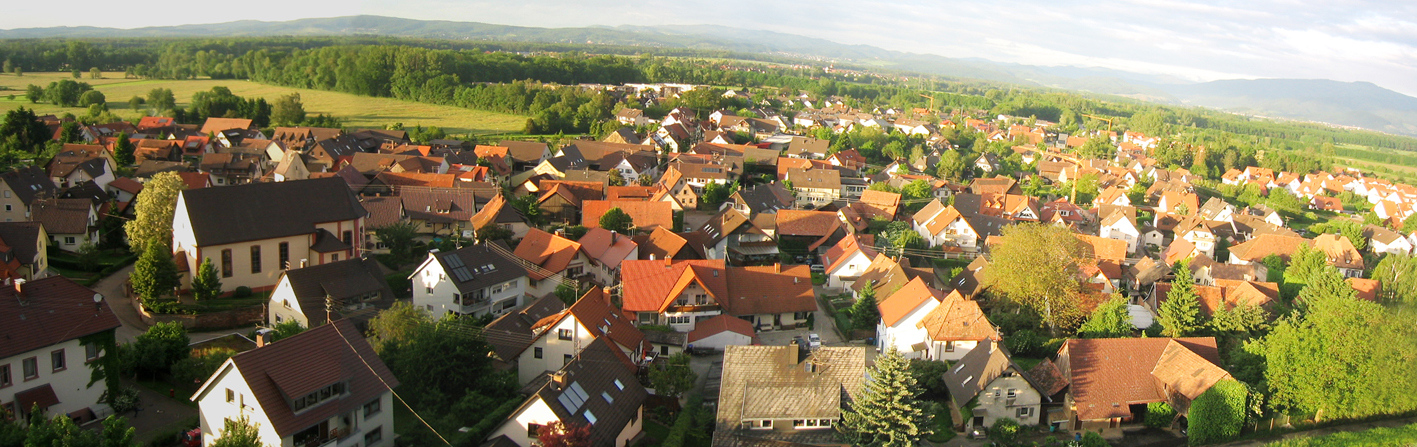
March (Holzhausen )
