= Glottertal =

- Municipality
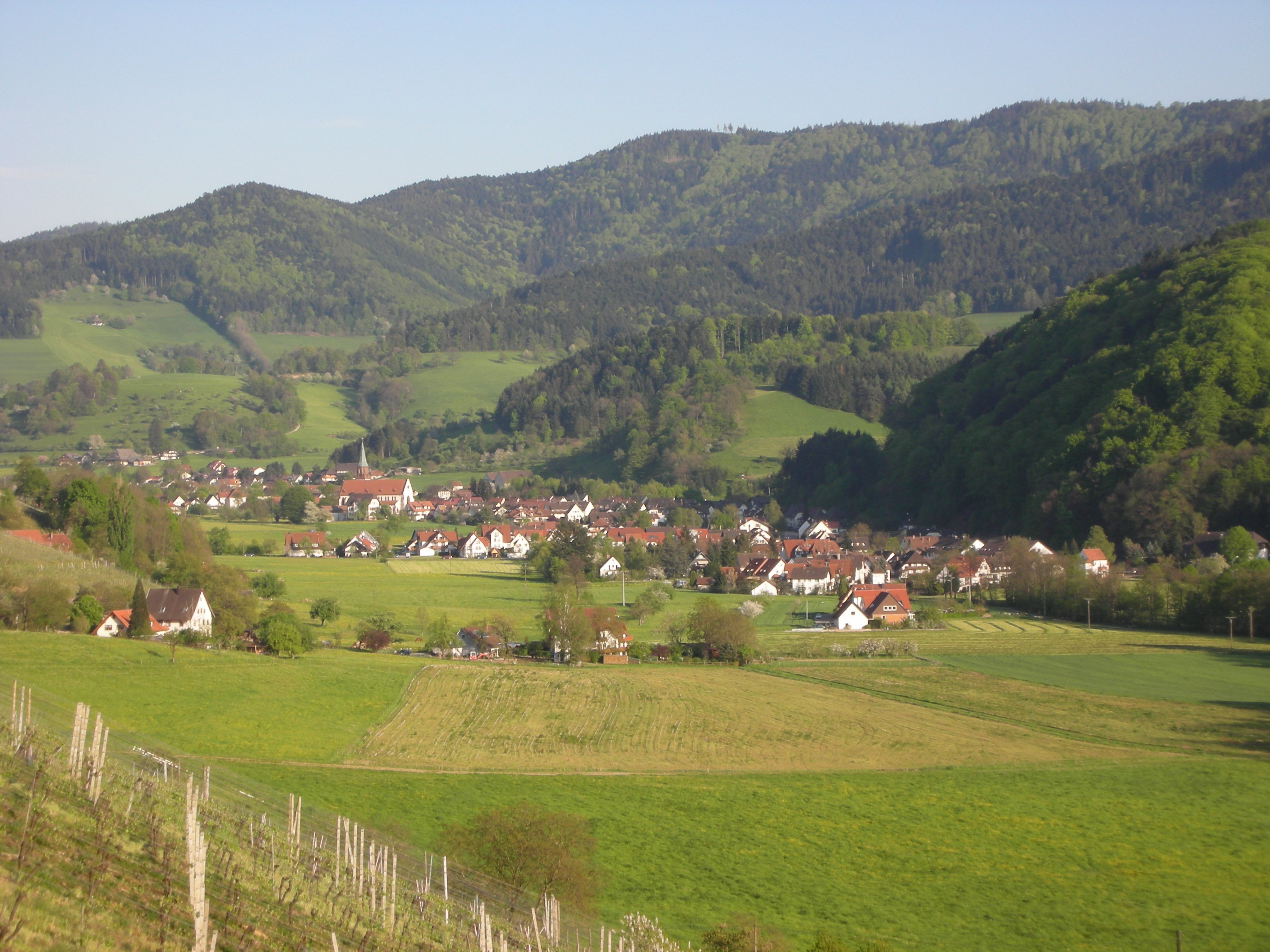

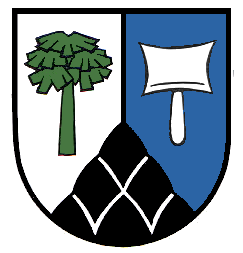
- Coat of arms

- Location of Glottertal within Breisgau-Hochschwarzwald district
- Interactive map of Glottertal
- Location within Germany Location within Baden-Württemberg
- Coordinates: 48°2′55″N 7°57′18″E
- Country: Germany
- State: Baden-Württemberg
- Admin. region: Freiburg
- District: Breisgau-Hochschwarzwald
- Subdivisions: 4

Government
  - Mayor (2022–30): Karl-Josef Herbstritt (CDU)

Area
  - Total: 30.76 km^{2} (11.88 sq mi)
- Elevation: 280–1,243 m (919–4,078 ft)

Population (2025-12-31)
  - Total: 3,215
  - Density: 104.5/km^{2} (270.7/sq mi)
- Time zone: UTC+01:00 (CET)
  - Summer (DST): UTC+02:00 (CEST)
- Postal codes: 79286
- Dialling codes: 07684
- Vehicle registration: FR
- Website: www.glottertal.de

Glottertal is a municipality in the district of Breisgau-Hochschwarzwald in Baden-Württemberg in southern Germany.

== History ==
The history of mining in the Glottertal goes back to Roman times and villages in the area are mentioned in the 12th century chronicles of the Abbey of Saint Peter in the Black Forest. From 1567 until the Napoleonic Wars the area was part of Further Austria and therefore part of the Habsburg monarchy. The Glottertal municipal area was formed in 1970. The four former independent villages Unterglottertal, Oberglottertal, Ohrensbach and Föhrental were merged into the Glottertal municipal.

== Points of interest ==
=== Buildings ===
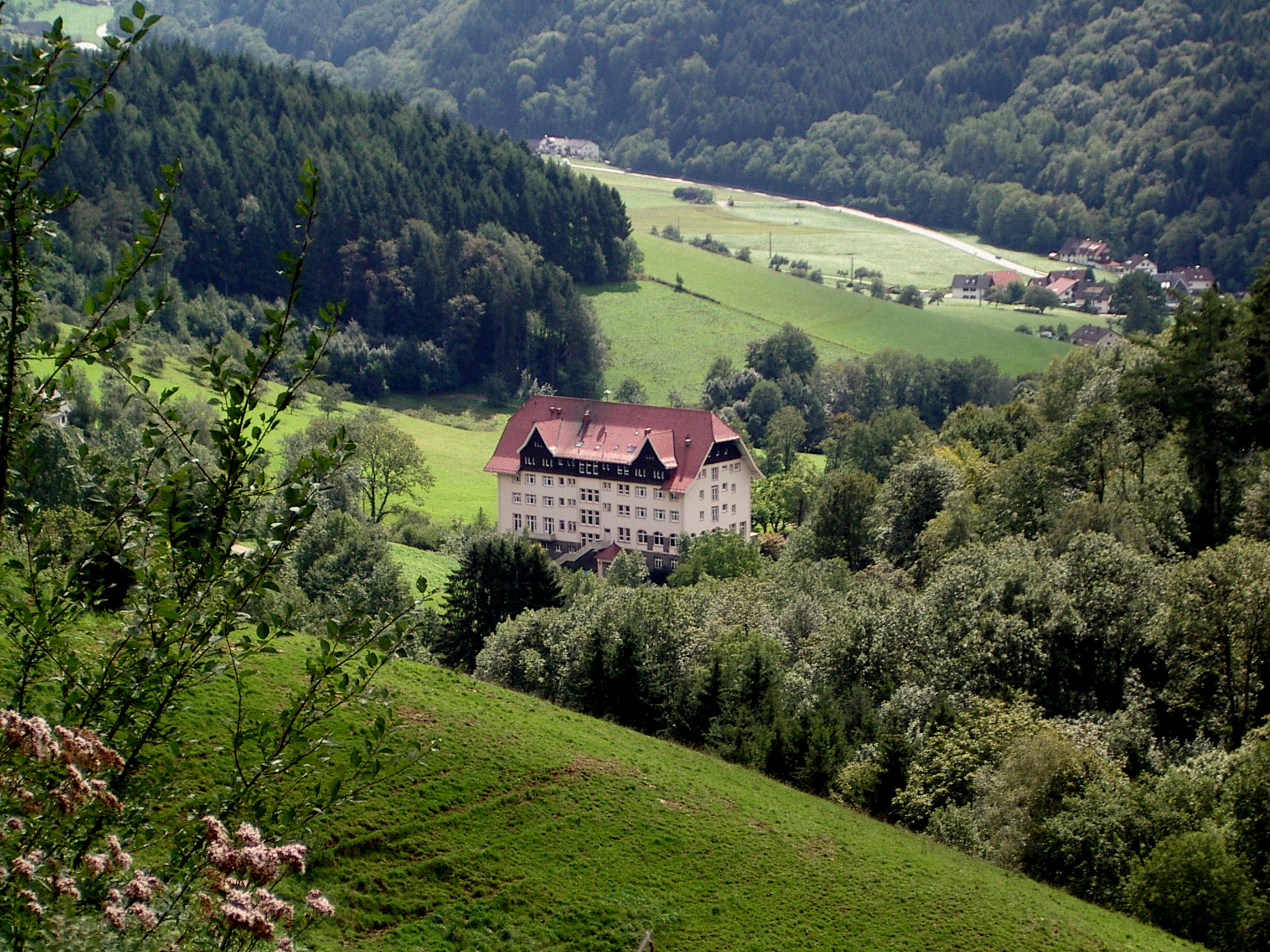
The real-life Glotterbad Clinic served as a set for the fictional Black Forest Clinic.

The 1914 built Carlsbau in Glottertal was the set for the 1980s medical drama television series The Black Forest Clinic. The outside of the building and the surrounding area was filmed while the interior was filmed in a set in Hamburg. The building was used as a clinic till it was closed down in 2004.

== Mining ==
The first archaeologic artefacts demonstrating iron smelting date back to the Roman time. The mining of silver started in the 11th century. The construction of a 15 kilometer long water channel to supply the mines with water do drive the pumps which was built in 1284 marks the importance of mining in the area. Flooding of the mines during a war period ended this activities at the end of the 12th century. The mining of silver continued on a smaller scale and in the 18th century the mining of iron and baryte was started. The last mines in the area closed before 1900.

== Geography ==
The town is located in a small valley south east of the Kandel mountain. The valley opens to the west and the water of the small river Glotter reaches the Elz and little later the Rhine.

== Gallery ==
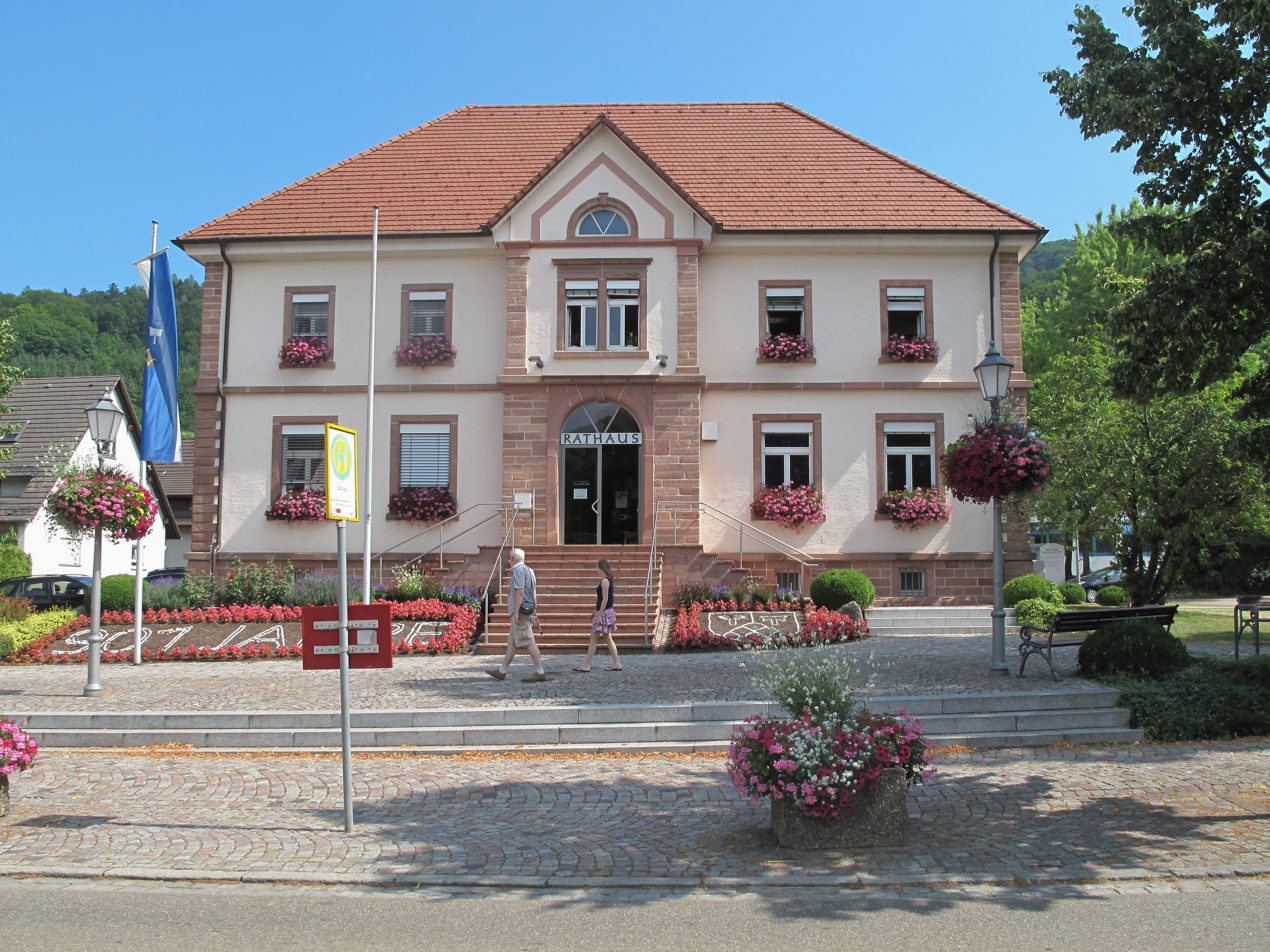
Glottertal, townhall

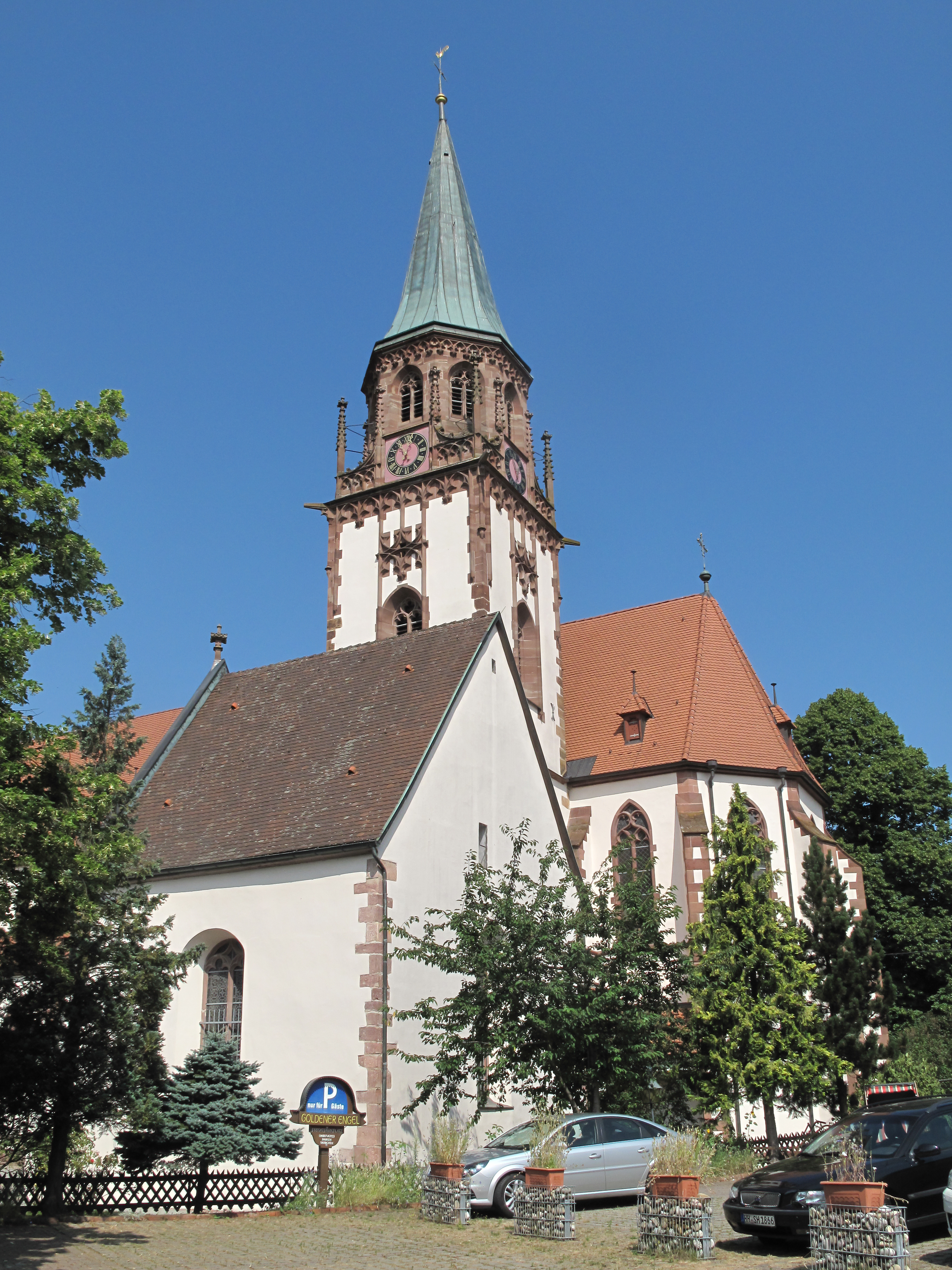
Glottertal, church: die Sankt Blasius Kirche

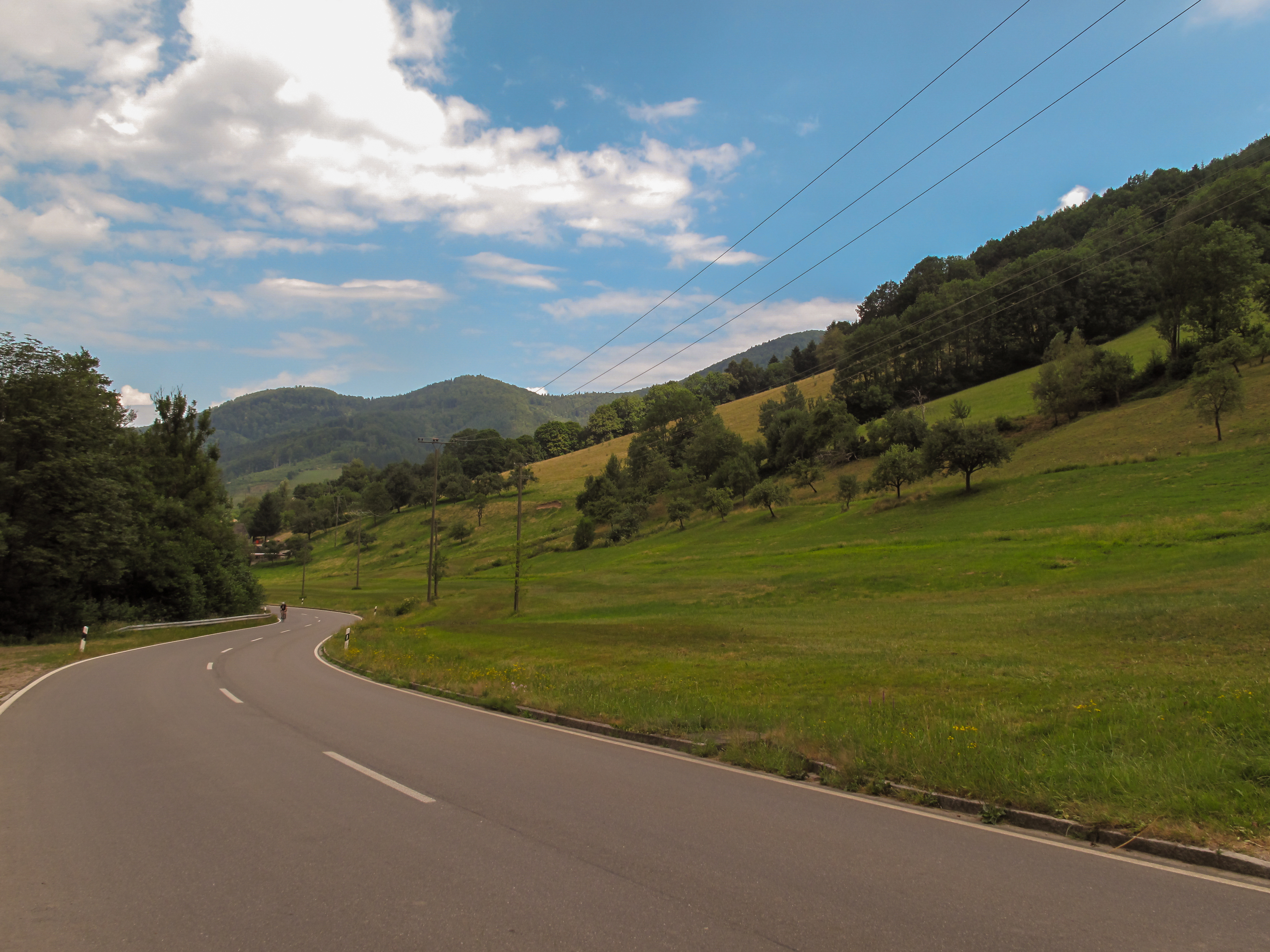
Between Glottertal and Sankt Peter, road panorama
