= Glotter =

River in Germany

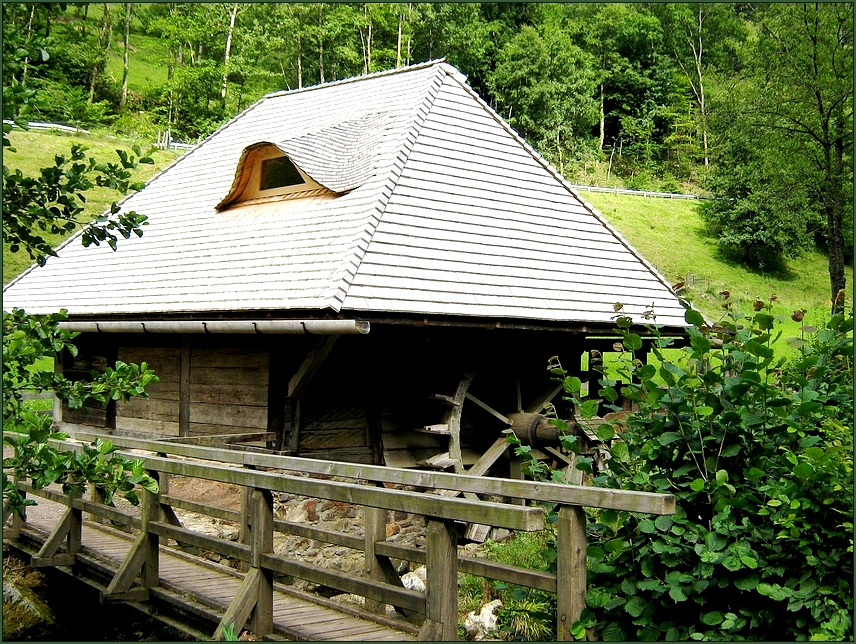
- Mill on the Glotter

Location
- Country: Germany
- State: Baden-Württemberg

Physical characteristics
- Mouth
  - location: Dreisam
  - coordinates: 48.1464°N 7.7554°E

Basin features
- Progression: Dreisam→ Elz→ Rhine→ North Sea

Glotter is a river of in the Breisgau region in the south of Baden-Württemberg, Germany which is approximately 30 km long. The spring of this river is located at an altitude of 1040 m amsl on the eastern slope of the Kandel near Neuwelt, a suburb of St. Peter in the Black Forest. It crosses the Glotter dale (in German: Glottertal, which is also the name of a village). Near Riegel am Kaiserstuhl, it discharges into the Dreisam. Near Denzlingen, much of its water is diverted towards the Elz through the stream Lossele.

== See also ==
- List of rivers of Baden-Württemberg
