= Tuniberg =

Hill in Baden-Württemberg, Germany

Coordinates: 48°00′25″N 7°42′03″E

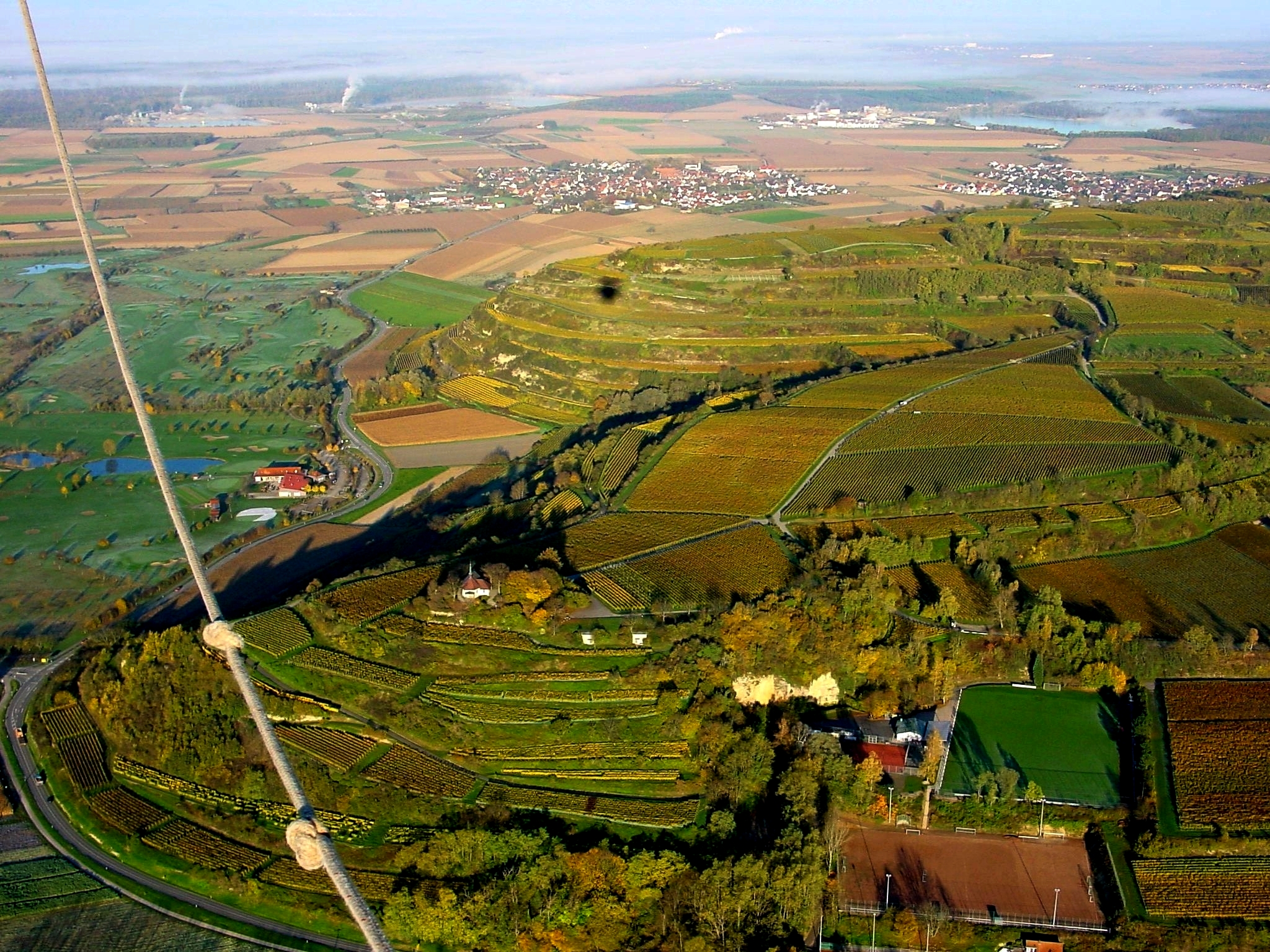
- Southern part of the Tuniberg with the Erentrudis chapel and the golf course.

Highest point
- Elevation: 312 m (1,024 ft)

Geography
- Location: Baden-Württemberg, Germany

Tuniberg is a hill in Baden-Württemberg, Germany.
