= Vörstetten =

- Municipality
- Coat of arms

- Location of Vörstetten within Emmendingen district
- Interactive map of Vörstetten
- Location within Germany Location within Baden-Württemberg
- Coordinates: 48°3′51″N 7°50′57″E
- Country: Germany
- State: Baden-Württemberg
- Admin. region: Freiburg
- District: Emmendingen
- Subdivisions: 2

Government
  - Mayor (2017–25): Lars Brügner

Area
  - Total: 7.88 km^{2} (3.04 sq mi)
- Elevation: 220 m (720 ft)

Population (2025-12-31)
  - Total: 3,180
  - Density: 404/km^{2} (1,050/sq mi)
- Time zone: UTC+01:00 (CET)
  - Summer (DST): UTC+02:00 (CEST)
- Postal codes: 79279 79277
- Dialling codes: 07666
- Vehicle registration: EM
- Website: www.voerstetten.de

Vörstetten (German pronunciation: [ˈfœʁˌʃtɛtn̩]) is a municipality in the district of Emmendingen in Baden-Württemberg in Germany.

== Mayors ==
- Karl Adolf Bolz (1945–1948)
- Karl Joseph Reisacher (1948–1957)
- Heinz Erhard Ritter (1957–1977)
- Karl Heinz Beck (1977–2009)
- Lars Brügner (since 2009)

== Twin towns ==
Vörstetten is twinned with:

- L'Étrat, France
- La Tour-en-Jarez, France
