= Freiburg (electoral district) =

Federal electoral district of Germany

281 Freiburg
- Electoral district for the Bundestag
- Freiburg in 2025
- State: Baden-Württemberg
- Population: 320,800 (2019)
- Electorate: 224,392 (2021)
- Major settlements: Freiburg im Breisgau
- Area: 452.8 km^{2}

Current electoral district
- Created: 1949
- Party: GRÜNE
- Member: Chantal Kopf
- Elected: 2021, 2025

Freiburg is an electoral constituency (German: Wahlkreis) represented in the Bundestag. It elects one member via first-past-the-post voting. Under the current constituency numbering system, it is designated as constituency 281. It is located in southwestern Baden-Württemberg, comprising the city of Freiburg im Breisgau and northwestern parts of the district of Breisgau-Hochschwarzwald.

Freiburg was created for the inaugural 1949 federal election. Since 2021, it has been represented by Chantal Kopf of the Alliance 90/The Greens.

== Geography ==
Freiburg is located in southwestern Baden-Württemberg. As of the 2021 federal election, it comprises the independent city of Freiburg im Breisgau and the municipalities of Au, Bötzingen, Bollschweil, Breisach am Rhein, Ebringen, Ehrenkirchen, Eichstetten am Kaiserstuhl, Gottenheim, Horben, Ihringen, March, Merdingen, Merzhausen, Pfaffenweiler, Schallstadt, Sölden, Umkirch, Vogtsburg im Kaiserstuhl, and Wittnau from the Breisgau-Hochschwarzwald district.

== History ==
Freiburg was created in 1949. In the 1949 election, it was Baden constituency 4 in the numbering system. In the 1953 through 1961 elections, it was number 186. In the 1965 through 1976 elections, it was number 190. In the 1980 through 1998 elections, it was number 185. In the 2002 and 2005 elections, it was number 282. Since the 2009 election, it has been number 281.

Originally, the constituency comprised the independent city of Freiburg im Breisgau and the Landkreis Freiburg district. In the 1980 election, it acquired a configuration similar to its current borders, but including the municipalities of Glottertal, Gundelfingen, Heuweiler, Kirchzarten, Oberried, Sankt Märgen, Sankt Peter, and Stegen from the Breisgau-Hochschwarzwald district. It acquired its current borders in the 2002 election.

Election	No.	Name	Borders
1949	4	Freiburg	Freiburg im Breisgau; Landkreis Freiburg district
1953	186	Freiburg	Freiburg im Breisgau; Landkreis Freiburg district
1957	186	Freiburg	Freiburg im Breisgau; Landkreis Freiburg district
1961	186	Freiburg	Freiburg im Breisgau; Landkreis Freiburg district
1965	190	Freiburg	Freiburg im Breisgau; Landkreis Freiburg district
1969	190	Freiburg	Freiburg im Breisgau; Landkreis Freiburg district
1972	190	Freiburg	Freiburg im Breisgau; Landkreis Freiburg district
1976	190	Freiburg	Freiburg im Breisgau; Landkreis Freiburg district
1980	185	Freiburg	Freiburg im Breisgau; Breisgau-Hochschwarzwald district (only Au, Bötzingen, Bollschweil, Breisach am Rhein, Ebringen, Ehrenkirchen, Eichstetten am Kaiserstuhl, Gottenheim, Horben, Ihringen, March, Merdingen, Merzhausen, Pfaffenweiler, Schallstadt, Sölden, Umkirch, Vogtsburg im Kaiserstuhl, Wittnau, Glottertal, Gundelfingen, Heuweiler, Kirchzarten, Oberried, Sankt Märgen, Sankt Peter, and Stegen municipalities)
1983	185	Freiburg	Freiburg im Breisgau; Breisgau-Hochschwarzwald district (only Au, Bötzingen, Bollschweil, Breisach am Rhein, Ebringen, Ehrenkirchen, Eichstetten am Kaiserstuhl, Gottenheim, Horben, Ihringen, March, Merdingen, Merzhausen, Pfaffenweiler, Schallstadt, Sölden, Umkirch, Vogtsburg im Kaiserstuhl, Wittnau, Glottertal, Gundelfingen, Heuweiler, Kirchzarten, Oberried, Sankt Märgen, Sankt Peter, and Stegen municipalities)
1987	185	Freiburg	Freiburg im Breisgau; Breisgau-Hochschwarzwald district (only Au, Bötzingen, Bollschweil, Breisach am Rhein, Ebringen, Ehrenkirchen, Eichstetten am Kaiserstuhl, Gottenheim, Horben, Ihringen, March, Merdingen, Merzhausen, Pfaffenweiler, Schallstadt, Sölden, Umkirch, Vogtsburg im Kaiserstuhl, Wittnau, Glottertal, Gundelfingen, Heuweiler, Kirchzarten, Oberried, Sankt Märgen, Sankt Peter, and Stegen municipalities)
1990	185	Freiburg	Freiburg im Breisgau; Breisgau-Hochschwarzwald district (only Au, Bötzingen, Bollschweil, Breisach am Rhein, Ebringen, Ehrenkirchen, Eichstetten am Kaiserstuhl, Gottenheim, Horben, Ihringen, March, Merdingen, Merzhausen, Pfaffenweiler, Schallstadt, Sölden, Umkirch, Vogtsburg im Kaiserstuhl, Wittnau, Glottertal, Gundelfingen, Heuweiler, Kirchzarten, Oberried, Sankt Märgen, Sankt Peter, and Stegen municipalities)
1994	185	Freiburg	Freiburg im Breisgau; Breisgau-Hochschwarzwald district (only Au, Bötzingen, Bollschweil, Breisach am Rhein, Ebringen, Ehrenkirchen, Eichstetten am Kaiserstuhl, Gottenheim, Horben, Ihringen, March, Merdingen, Merzhausen, Pfaffenweiler, Schallstadt, Sölden, Umkirch, Vogtsburg im Kaiserstuhl, Wittnau, Glottertal, Gundelfingen, Heuweiler, Kirchzarten, Oberried, Sankt Märgen, Sankt Peter, and Stegen municipalities)
1998	185	Freiburg	Freiburg im Breisgau; Breisgau-Hochschwarzwald district (only Au, Bötzingen, Bollschweil, Breisach am Rhein, Ebringen, Ehrenkirchen, Eichstetten am Kaiserstuhl, Gottenheim, Horben, Ihringen, March, Merdingen, Merzhausen, Pfaffenweiler, Schallstadt, Sölden, Umkirch, Vogtsburg im Kaiserstuhl, Wittnau, Glottertal, Gundelfingen, Heuweiler, Kirchzarten, Oberried, Sankt Märgen, Sankt Peter, and Stegen municipalities)
2002	282	Freiburg	Freiburg im Breisgau; Breisgau-Hochschwarzwald district (only Au, Bötzingen, Bollschweil, Breisach am Rhein, Ebringen, Ehrenkirchen, Eichstetten am Kaiserstuhl, Gottenheim, Horben, Ihringen, March, Merdingen, Merzhausen, Pfaffenweiler, Schallstadt, Sölden, Umkirch, Vogtsburg im Kaiserstuhl, and Wittnau municipalities)
2005	282	Freiburg	Freiburg im Breisgau; Breisgau-Hochschwarzwald district (only Au, Bötzingen, Bollschweil, Breisach am Rhein, Ebringen, Ehrenkirchen, Eichstetten am Kaiserstuhl, Gottenheim, Horben, Ihringen, March, Merdingen, Merzhausen, Pfaffenweiler, Schallstadt, Sölden, Umkirch, Vogtsburg im Kaiserstuhl, and Wittnau municipalities)
2009	281	Freiburg	Freiburg im Breisgau; Breisgau-Hochschwarzwald district (only Au, Bötzingen, Bollschweil, Breisach am Rhein, Ebringen, Ehrenkirchen, Eichstetten am Kaiserstuhl, Gottenheim, Horben, Ihringen, March, Merdingen, Merzhausen, Pfaffenweiler, Schallstadt, Sölden, Umkirch, Vogtsburg im Kaiserstuhl, and Wittnau municipalities)
2013	281	Freiburg	Freiburg im Breisgau; Breisgau-Hochschwarzwald district (only Au, Bötzingen, Bollschweil, Breisach am Rhein, Ebringen, Ehrenkirchen, Eichstetten am Kaiserstuhl, Gottenheim, Horben, Ihringen, March, Merdingen, Merzhausen, Pfaffenweiler, Schallstadt, Sölden, Umkirch, Vogtsburg im Kaiserstuhl, and Wittnau municipalities)
2017	281	Freiburg	Freiburg im Breisgau; Breisgau-Hochschwarzwald district (only Au, Bötzingen, Bollschweil, Breisach am Rhein, Ebringen, Ehrenkirchen, Eichstetten am Kaiserstuhl, Gottenheim, Horben, Ihringen, March, Merdingen, Merzhausen, Pfaffenweiler, Schallstadt, Sölden, Umkirch, Vogtsburg im Kaiserstuhl, and Wittnau municipalities)
2021	281	Freiburg	Freiburg im Breisgau; Breisgau-Hochschwarzwald district (only Au, Bötzingen, Bollschweil, Breisach am Rhein, Ebringen, Ehrenkirchen, Eichstetten am Kaiserstuhl, Gottenheim, Horben, Ihringen, March, Merdingen, Merzhausen, Pfaffenweiler, Schallstadt, Sölden, Umkirch, Vogtsburg im Kaiserstuhl, and Wittnau municipalities)
2025	281	Freiburg	Freiburg im Breisgau; Breisgau-Hochschwarzwald district (only Au, Bötzingen, Bollschweil, Breisach am Rhein, Ebringen, Ehrenkirchen, Eichstetten am Kaiserstuhl, Gottenheim, Horben, Ihringen, March, Merdingen, Merzhausen, Pfaffenweiler, Schallstadt, Sölden, Umkirch, Vogtsburg im Kaiserstuhl, and Wittnau municipalities)

== Members ==
The constituency has been held by Christian Democratic Union (CDU) during all but four Bundestag terms since its creation. It was first represented by Hermann Kopf from 1949 to 1969, followed by Hans Evers from 1969 to 1980. Conrad Schroeder was representative from 1980 to 1994, followed by Sigrun Löwisch from 1994 to 1998. Gernot Erler of the Social Democratic Party (SPD) was elected in 1998 and served until 2013. Matern von Marschall of the CDU was representative from 2013 to 2021. Chantal Kopf won the constituency for the Greens in 2021.

Election	Member	Party	%
1949	Hermann Kopf	CDU	48.6
1953	Hermann Kopf	CDU	57.6
1957	Hermann Kopf	CDU	56.1
1961	Hermann Kopf	CDU	48.2
1965	Hermann Kopf	CDU	52.1
1969	Hans Evers	CDU	49.3
1972	Hans Evers	CDU	47.1
1976	Hans Evers	CDU	48.4
1980	Conrad Schroeder	CDU	43.5
1983	Conrad Schroeder	CDU	50.5
1987	Conrad Schroeder	CDU	43.2
1990	Conrad Schroeder	CDU	40.9
1994	Sigrun Löwisch	CDU	42.0
1998	Gernot Erler	SPD	41.5
2002	Gernot Erler	SPD	48.3
2005	Gernot Erler	SPD	45.1
2009	Gernot Erler	SPD	33.0
2013	Matern von Marschall	CDU	34.9
2017	Matern von Marschall	CDU	28.0
2021	Chantal Kopf	GRÜNE	28.8
2025	Chantal Kopf	GRÜNE	32.5

== Election results ==
=== 2025 election ===
Federal election (2025): Freiburg
Notes:	Blue background denotes the winner of the electorate vote. Pink background denotes a candidate elected from their party list. Yellow background denotes an electorate win by a list member, or other incumbent. A ✓ or ✗ denotes status of any incumbent, win or lose respectively.						
Party	Candidate	Votes	%	±%	Party votes	%	±%
Greens	✓ Chantal Kopf	63,281	32.5	▲3.7	51,966	26.6	▼5.0
CDU	Klaus Schüle	47,806	24.5	▲3.9	43,343	22.2	▲4.8
SPD	✗ Ludwig Striet	30,485	15.7	▼10.6	29,933	15.3	▼5.9
AfD	Martina Kempf	20,008	10.3	▲5.8	20,285	10.4	▲5.5
Left	Vinzenz Glaser	19,518	10.0	▲4.7	27,165	13.9	▲7.0
FDP	Ruben Schäfer	5,542	2.8	▼4.9	8,284	4.2	▼6.4
BSW					6,856	3.5	
Tierschutzpartei					2,092	1.2	▲0.1
Volt	Adrian Nantscheff	3,469	1.8	▲1.2	2,140	1.1	▲0.7
Tierschutzpartei					1,649	0.8	▼0.3
FW	Ulrich Kissel	2,574	1.3	▼0.2	1,400	07	▼0.3
PARTEI		1,842	0.9	▼0.6	903	0.5	▼0.5
MLPD	Elias Krieger	238	0.1	0.0	74	0.0	0.0
ÖDP					373	0.2	▼0.1
Bündnis C					275	0.1	Steady
BD					156	0.1	
Gesundheitsforschung							▼0.1
Humanists				▼0.3			▼0.2
Team Todenhöfer							▼0.3
Informal votes		1,297			795		
Total valid votes		194,763			195,265		
Turnout		196,060	85.9	▲5.2			
Greens hold	Majority			▲3.7			

=== 2021 election ===
Federal election (2021): Freiburg
Notes:	Blue background denotes the winner of the electorate vote. Pink background denotes a candidate elected from their party list. Yellow background denotes an electorate win by a list member, or other incumbent. A ✓ or ✗ denotes status of any incumbent, win or lose respectively.						
Party	Candidate	Votes	%	±%	Party votes	%	±%
Greens	Chantal Kopf	51,777	28.8	▲3.1	56,861	31.6	▲10.4
SPD	Julia Söhne	47,198	26.3	▲3.6	38,183	21.2	▲3.7
CDU	✗ Matern von Marschall	37,111	20.6	▼7.4	31,296	17.4	▼10.7
FDP	Claudia Raffelhüschen (Note: Raffelhüschen entered the Bundestag on the FDP list after Christian Jung declined his mandate.)	13,835	7.7	▲2.4	19,145	10.6	▲1.3
Left	Tobias Pflüger	9,604	5.3	▼2.0	12,429	6.9	▼4.3
AfD	Marco Näger	8,107	4.5	▼2.7	8,854	4.9	▼2.9
dieBasis	Sabine Kropf	4,115	2.3		3,779	2.1	
Tierschutzpartei					2,092	1.2	▲0.1
FW	Anke Glenz	2,769	1.5		1,821	1.0	▲0.7
PARTEI	Hanna Kohl	2,730	1.5	▲0.1	1,719	1.0	▼0.1
Volt	Anna Rasputina	1,043	0.6		801	0.4	
KlimalisteBW	Alexander Grevel	785	0.4				
Team Todenhöfer					610	0.3	
ÖDP					571	0.3	▼0.1
Pirates					475	0.3	▼0.1
Bündnis C					281	0.2	
Humanists	Simon Grimm	561	0.3		280	0.2	
DiB					220	0.1	▼0.2
Gesundheitsforschung					145	0.1	
Bürgerbewegung					96	0.1	
MLPD	Mira Kaizl	134	0.1	▼0.1	74	0.0	0.0
NPD					60	0.0	▼0.1
Bündnis 21					35	0.0	
LKR					27	0.0	
DKP					19	0.0	0.0
Informal votes		1,207			1,103		
Total valid votes		179,769			179,873		
Turnout		180,976	80.7	▼0.7			
Greens gain from CDU	Majority	4,579	2.5				

=== 2017 election ===
Federal election (2017): Freiburg
Notes:	Blue background denotes the winner of the electorate vote. Pink background denotes a candidate elected from their party list. Yellow background denotes an electorate win by a list member, or other incumbent. A ✓ or ✗ denotes status of any incumbent, win or lose respectively.						
Party	Candidate	Votes	%	±%	Party votes	%	±%
CDU	✓ Matern von Marschall	50,256	28.0	▼6.9	50,423	28.1	▼7.3
Greens	Kerstin Andreae	46,115	25.7	▲4.8	38,002	21.2	▲1.3
SPD	Julien Bender	40,647	22.7	▼7.4	31,452	17.5	▼4.6
Left	Tobias Pflüger	13,172	7.3	▲2.5	20,168	11.2	▲3.4
AfD	Volker Kempf	12,984	7.2	▲4.7	14,103	7.9	▲4.0
FDP	Adrian Hurrle	9,546	5.3	▲3.4	16,725	9.3	▲4.5
Tierschutzpartei	Sonia-Ellen Hösl	2,890	1.6		1,958	1.1	▲0.2
PARTEI	Tim Jochmann	2,538	1.4		1,846	1.0	
BGE					871	0.5	
ÖDP					716	0.4	0.0
Pirates					626	0.3	▼2.6
FW					608	0.3	▼0.1
Independent	Daniel Barski	583	0.3				
DiB					560	0.3	
Bündnis C	Peter Uhrmeister	406	0.2				
Tierschutzallianz					275	0.2	
NPD					261	0.1	▼0.3
DM					257	0.1	
Menschliche Welt					239	0.1	
V-Partei³					229	0.1	
MLPD	Martin Halbritter	237	0.1		137	0.1	0.0
DKP					45	0.0	
DIE RECHTE					34	0.0	
Informal votes		1,480			1,319		
Total valid votes		179,374			179,535		
Turnout		180,854	81.4	▲4.7			
CDU hold	Majority	4,141	2.3	▼2.6			

=== 2013 election ===
Federal election (2013): Freiburg
Notes:	Blue background denotes the winner of the electorate vote. Pink background denotes a candidate elected from their party list. Yellow background denotes an electorate win by a list member, or other incumbent. A ✓ or ✗ denotes status of any incumbent, win or lose respectively.						
Party	Candidate	Votes	%	±%	Party votes	%	±%
CDU	Matern von Marschall	58,106	34.9	▲6.0	59,007	35.4	▲8.3
SPD	✗ Gernot Erler	50,004	30.0	▼3.0	36,791	22.1	▲1.1
Greens	Kerstin Andreae	34,762	20.9	▼1.0	33,044	19.8	▼3.0
Left	Tobias Pflüger	8,083	4.9	▼1.4	13,105	7.9	▼1.0
AfD	Elke Fein	4,207	2.5		6,384	3.8	
Pirates	André Martens	3,829	2.3		4,973	3.0	▲0.2
FDP	Sascha Fiek	3,182	1.9	▼6.3	8,059	4.8	▼9.2
Independent	Martin Kissel	1,800	1.1				
Tierschutzpartei					1,465	0.9	▲0.1
FW	Rolf Dieter Hauser	1,111	0.7		732	0.4	
NPD	Michael Kerber	950	0.6	0.0	784	0.5	0.0
ÖDP					642	0.4	▲0.1
RENTNER					363	0.2	
PBC					329	0.2	▼0.2
REP					282	0.2	▼0.5
Volksabstimmung					261	0.2	▼0.1
Party of Reason					120	0.1	
PRO					88	0.1	
MLPD					77	0.0	0.0
BIG					52	0.0	
Independent	Naseem Verweyen	48	0.0				
BüSo					21	0.0	0.0
Informal votes		1,726			1,681		
Total valid votes		166,534			166,579		
Turnout		168,260	76.7	▲1.8			
CDU gain from SPD	Majority	8,102	4.9				

=== 2009 election ===
Federal election (2009): Freiburg
Notes:	Blue background denotes the winner of the electorate vote. Pink background denotes a candidate elected from their party list. Yellow background denotes an electorate win by a list member, or other incumbent. A ✓ or ✗ denotes status of any incumbent, win or lose respectively.						
Party	Candidate	Votes	%	±%	Party votes	%	±%
SPD	✓ Gernot Erler	51,192	33.0	▼12.1	32,691	21.0	▼10.0
CDU	Daniel Sander	44,749	28.8	▼5.6	42,224	27.1	▼2.5
Greens	Kerstin Andreae	33,878	21.8	▲10.9	35,536	22.8	▲0.1
FDP	Sascha Fiek	12,674	8.2	▲4.4	21,887	14.1	▲4.9
Left	Uta Spöri	9,675	6.2	▲1.9	13,793	8.9	▲3.9
Pirates					4,289	2.8	
Tierschutzpartei					1,165	0.7	
REP	Heiko Trenkle	1,063	0.7		981	0.6	▲0.2
NPD	Susanne Hoffmann	890	0.6	▼0.3	764	0.5	▼0.2
DIE VIOLETTEN	Markus Benz	1,023	0.7		658	0.4	
PBC					581	0.4	▲0.1
ÖDP					474	0.3	
Volksabstimmung					369	0.2	
MLPD					88	0.1	0.0
DVU					78	0.1	
ADM					56	0.0	
BüSo					49	0.0	0.0
Informal votes		2,537			1,998		
Total valid votes		155,144			155,683		
Turnout		157,681	74.9	▼5.6			
SPD hold	Majority	6,443	4.2	▼6.5			

=== 2005 election ===
Federal election (2005):Freiburg
Notes:	Blue background denotes the winner of the electorate vote. Pink background denotes a candidate elected from their party list. Yellow background denotes an electorate win by a list member, or other incumbent. A ✓ or ✗ denotes status of any incumbent, win or lose respectively.						
Party	Candidate	Votes	%	±%	Party votes	%	±%
SPD	✓ Gernot Erler	73,278	45.1	▼3.2	50,480	31.0	▼2.4
CDU	Cornelia Mayer	55,922	34.4	▲2.5	48,254	29.6	▼0.8
Greens	Kerstin Andreae	17,809	11.0	▼1.7	37,082	22.8	▼2.3
Left	Michael Moos	6,964	4.3	▲3.0	8,009	4.9	▲3.2
FDP	Patrick Evers	6,180	3.8	▼2.0	14,845	9.1	▲2.1
NPD	Carmen Kiesel	1,427	0.9		1,068	0.7	▲0.4
PARTEI	Martin Walcher	874	0.5				
Familie					809	0.5	
GRAUEN					803	0.5	▲0.3
REP					763	0.5	0.0
PBC					502	0.3	0.0
MLPD					157	0.1	
BüSo					87	0.1	0.0
Informal votes		2,556			2,151		
Total valid votes		162,454			162,859		
Turnout		165,010	80.4	▼1.4			
SPD hold	Majority	17,356	10.7				
