= Breisgau (electoral district) =

State electoral district of Germany

48: Breisgau
- Electoral district for the Landtag of Baden-Württemberg
- Heilbronn in 2026
- District: Breisgau-Hochschwarzwald and Lörrach
- Electorate: 132,404 (2026)
- Major settlements: Au, Auggen, Bad Krozingen, Badenweiler, Ballrechten-Dottingen, Bötzingen, Bollschweil, Breisach am Rhein, Buggingen, Ebringen, Ehrenkirchen, Eichstetten am Kaiserstuhl, Eschbach, Hartheim, Heitersheim, Horben, Ihringen, Merdingen, Merzhausen, Müllheim im Markgräflerland, Münstertal, Neuenburg am Rhein, Pfaffenweiler, Sölden, Staufen im Breisgau, Sulzburg, Vogtsburg im Kaiserstuhl, Wittenau, Kandern, Malsburg-Marzell, and Wittnau

Current electoral district
- Party: CDU
- Member: Patrick Rapp

Breisgau is an electoral constituency (German: Wahlkreis) represented in the Landtag of Baden-Württemberg. Since 2026, it has elected one member via first-past-the-post voting. Voters cast a second vote under which additional seats are allocated proportionally state-wide. Under the constituency numbering system, it is designated as constituency 48. It is split between the districts of Breisgau-Hochschwarzwald and Lörrach.

== Geography ==
The constituency includes:

- The municipalities of Au, Auggen, Bad Krozingen, Badenweiler, Ballrechten-Dottingen, Bötzingen, Bollschweil, Breisach am Rhein, Buggingen, Ebringen, Ehrenkirchen, Eichstetten am Kaiserstuhl, Eschbach, Hartheim, Heitersheim, Horben, Ihringen, Merdingen, Merzhausen, Müllheim im Markgräflerland, Münstertal, Neuenburg am Rhein, Pfaffenweiler, Sölden, Staufen im Breisgau, Sulzburg, Vogtsburg im Kaiserstuhl, and Wittenau within the district of Breisgau-Hochschwarzwald.
- The municipalities of Kandern, Malsburg-Marzell, and Wittnau, within the district of Lörrach.

There were 132,404 eligible voters in 2026.

== Members ==
=== First mandate ===
Both prior to and since the electoral reforms for the 2026 election, the winner of the plurality of the vote (first-past-the-post) in every constituency won the first mandate.

Election	Member	Party	%
1976	Gundolf Fleischer	CDU	
1980	Gundolf Fleischer	CDU	
1984	Gundolf Fleischer	CDU	
1988	Gundolf Fleischer	CDU	
1992	Gundolf Fleischer	CDU	
1996	Gundolf Fleischer	CDU	
2001	Gundolf Fleischer	CDU	44.6
2006	Gundolf Fleischer	CDU	44.9
2011	Patrick Rapp	CDU	33.5
2016	Bärbl Mielich	Grüne	35.1
2021	Reinhold Pix	Grüne	37.7
2026	Patrick Rapp	CDU	36.4

=== Second mandate ===
Prior to the electoral reforms for the 2026 election, the seats in the state parliament were allocated proportionately amongst parties which received more than 5% of valid votes across the state. The seats that were won proportionally for parties that did not win as many first mandates as seats they were entitled to, were allocated to their candidates which received the highest proportion of the vote in their respective constituencies. This meant that following some elections, a constituency would have one or more members elected under a second mandate.

Prior to 2011, these second mandates were allocated to the party candidates who got the greatest number of votes, whilst from 2011-2021, these were allocated according to percentage share of the vote.

Prior to 1984, this constituency did not elect any members on a second mandate.

Election	Member	Party	Member	Party
1984	Ulrich Brinkmann	SPD		
1988	Ulrich Brinkmann	SPD		
1992	Ulrich Brinkmann	SPD		
1996	Ulrich Brinkmann	SPD	Stephanie Günther	Grüne
Dec 2000	Walter Krögner	SPD	Stephanie Günther	Grüne
2001	Christoph Bayer	SPD		
2006	Christoph Bayer	SPD	Bärbl Mielich	Grüne
2011	Christoph Bayer	SPD	Bärbl Mielich	Grüne
2016	Patrick Rapp	CDU		
2021	Patrick Rapp	CDU		

== Election results ==
=== 2026 election ===
State election (2026): Breisgau
Notes:	Blue background denotes the winner of the electorate vote. Pink background denotes a candidate elected from their party list. Yellow background denotes an electorate win by a list member, or other incumbent. A ✓ or ✗ denotes status of any incumbent, win or lose respectively.						
Party	Candidate	Votes	%	±%	Party votes	%	±%
CDU	Patrick Rapp	34,259	36.4	▲12.5	27,212	28.8	▲4.9
Greens	Anna Deparnay-Grunenberg	28,173	30.0	▼7.8	32,509	34.4	▼3.3
AfD	Martina Böswald	14,919	15.9	▲8.9	14,222	15.0	▲8.0
SPD	Philip Wolf	7,545	8.0	▼2.3	5,517	5.8	▼4.5
Left	Eric Waibel	5,320	5.7	▲1.9	4,292	4.5	▲0.8
FDP	Lothar Hanser	3,848	4.1	▼4.9	3,562	3.8	▼5.2
FW					2,057	2.2	▼0.6
BSW					1,325	1.4	
APT					1,132	1.2	
Volt					894	0.9	
PARTEI					449	0.5	▼1.2
dieBasis					329	0.3	▼0.8
Bündnis C					218	0.2	
ÖDP					175	0.2	▼0.6
Pensioners					164	0.2	
Values					163	0.2	
Team Todenhöfer					74	0.1	
PdF					71	0.1	
KlimalisteBW					67	0.1	▼0.9
Verjüngungsforschung					58	0.1	
Humanists					42	0.0	
Informal votes		991			523		
Total valid votes		94,064			94,532		
Turnout		95,055	71.8	▲5.6			
CDU gain from Greens	Majority	6,086	6.4				

== See also ==
- Politics of Baden-Württemberg
- Landtag of Baden-Württemberg
