= Kopf =

Kopf (German: head) is a surname. Notable people with the surname include:

- Abigail Kopf, American mass shooting survivor
- Chantal Kopf (born 1995), German politician
- David Kopf, American research scholar on South Asian history
- Herb Kopf (1901–1996), American football coach
- Hermann Kopf (1901–1991), German politician
- Hinrich Wilhelm Kopf (1893–1961), German politician
- Jakub Kopf (1915–1983), Polish basketball player
- Karlheinz Kopf (born 1957), Austrian politician
- Larry Kopf (1890–1986), American baseball player
- Silas Kopf (born 1949), American furniture maker
- Richard G. Kopf (1946–2025), American federal judge
- Wally Kopf (1899–1979), German American professional baseball player

== See also ==
- Kemptner Kopf, a mountain of Bavaria, Germany
- Siplinger Kopf, a mountain of Bavaria, Germany
- Wiedemer Kopf, a mountain of Bavaria, Germany
- Niedensteiner Kopf, a mountain of Schwalm-Eder-Kreis, Hesse, Germany
- Mappershainer Kopf, a mountain peak in the Taunus range, Hesse, Germany
