= Sölden Priory =

Sölden Priory was initially a Cluniac monastery of nuns, established in 1115 at Sölden in the district of Breisgau-Hochschwarzwald in the Black Forest, Baden-Württemberg, Germany. In the 16th century it became a community of monks.

== History ==
About A.D. 1087, Saint Ulrich of Zell, a monk of the Abbey of Cluny, founded Bollschweil Priory, a monastery for nuns, which was moved in 1115 to nearby Sölden and became known as Sölden Priory. This foundation complemented the monastery he had founded at Grüningen and later moved to Zell, which was later known as St. Ulrich's Priory in the Black Forest (German: Priorat des sankt Ulrich im Schwarzwald).

Sölden was a priory directly subject to Cluny, as was the norm in that reform congregation of the Order of St. Benedict. The community consisted of approximately 13 to 20 nuns under a prior appointed by Cluny. The priory declined so severely in the 15th century that by 1500 there were no nuns left here, and the priory eventually became occupied by monks. The men were subject at first to St. George's Abbey in the Black Forest from about 1546 and then transferred in 1560 to St. Peter's Abbey in the Black Forest, into which it was formally incorporated in 1598.

The priory was dissolved in 1807 in the course of secularisation.

== Territory and buildings ==
Sölden's grounds were not extensive and were concentrated in Breisgau. The Vogtei belonged to the Priory of St. Ulrich.

Of the monastic buildings still remaining, the oldest portions date from the 15th century. Much refurbishment took place in the Baroque period.

== Priors of Sölden ==
- Rudolf Ecklin (1514-1541)
- Johann Maternus Roth (1570, 1580)
- Christoph Sutter (1581)
- Gallus Vögelin (1596)
- Michael Stöcklin (1597)
- Johann Jakob Pfeiffer (vor 1601-1610)
- Johannes Schwab (1612, 1635?)
- Matthäus Welzenmüller (1624?-1637)
- Johann Baptist Heinold (1672, -1692)
- Placidus Steiger (1692-1705)
- Ulrich Bürgi (1705-1712)
- Gregor Gerwig (1712, 1716)
- Heinrich Füegl (1718)
- Aemilian Kaufmann (1723, 1730)
- Cajetan Hildtprandt (1744, 1746)
- Franz Dreer (1756)
- Ulrich van der Lew (1776-1786)
- Paul Hendinger (1786-1807)
