= Bollschweil Priory =

Priory in Bollschweil, Germany

Coordinates: 47°55′15″N 7°47′21″E

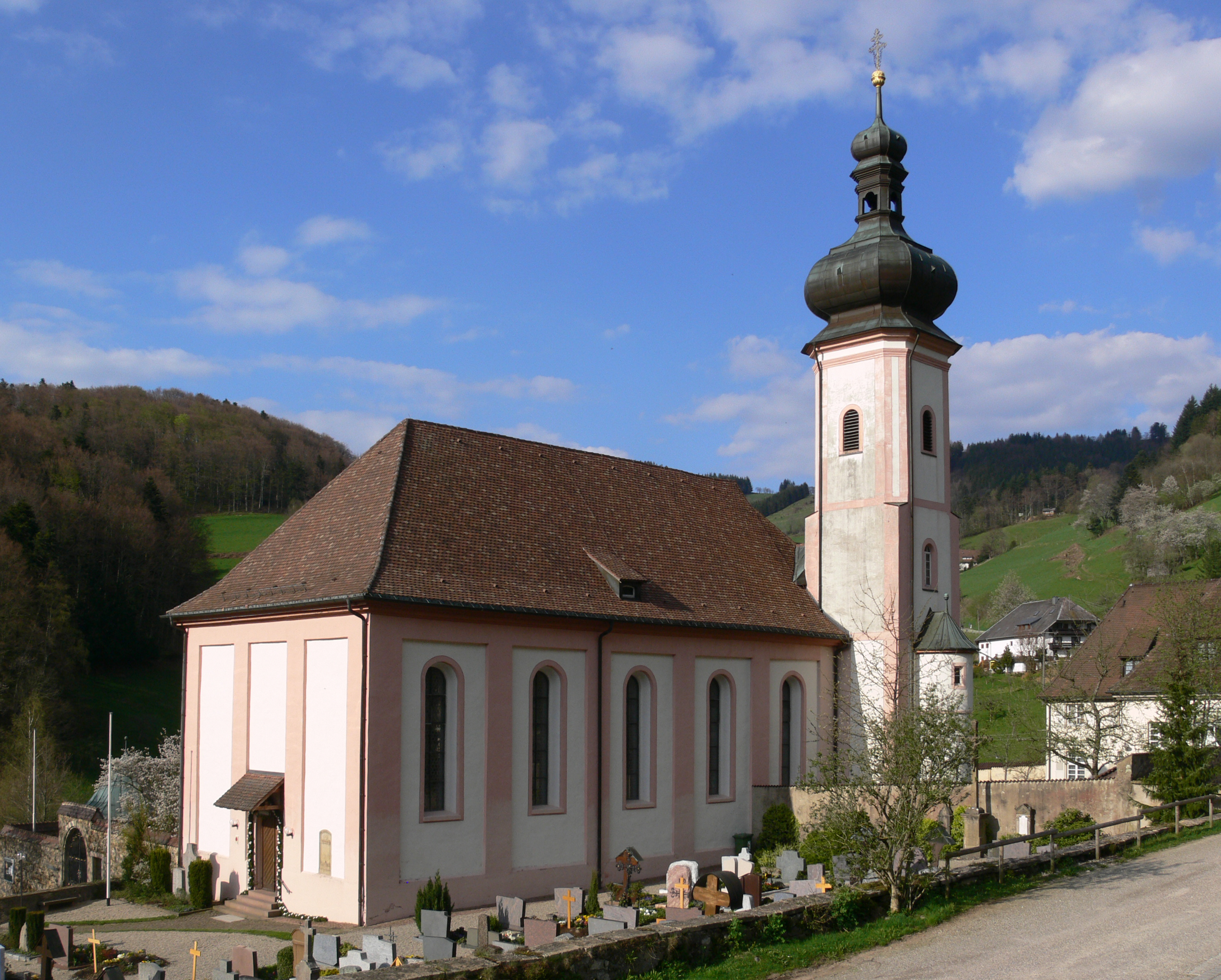
Parish church in the village of St. Ulrich (former Benedictine priory)

Bollschweil Priory was a Cluniac monastery of nuns at Bollschweil (formerly Bolesweiler) in the district of Breisgau-Hochschwarzwald, Baden-Württemberg, Germany.

It was founded by Saint Ulrich of Zell in or after 1087 to complement the monastery he had founded for monks at Grüningen, later moved to Zell. The priory was moved to nearby Sölden in 1115, probably due to the unsuitability of the site, after which time the monastic community became known as Sölden Priory.

== See also ==
- Sölden Priory
- Abbey of Cluny
