= Möhlin (Rhine) =

River in Germany

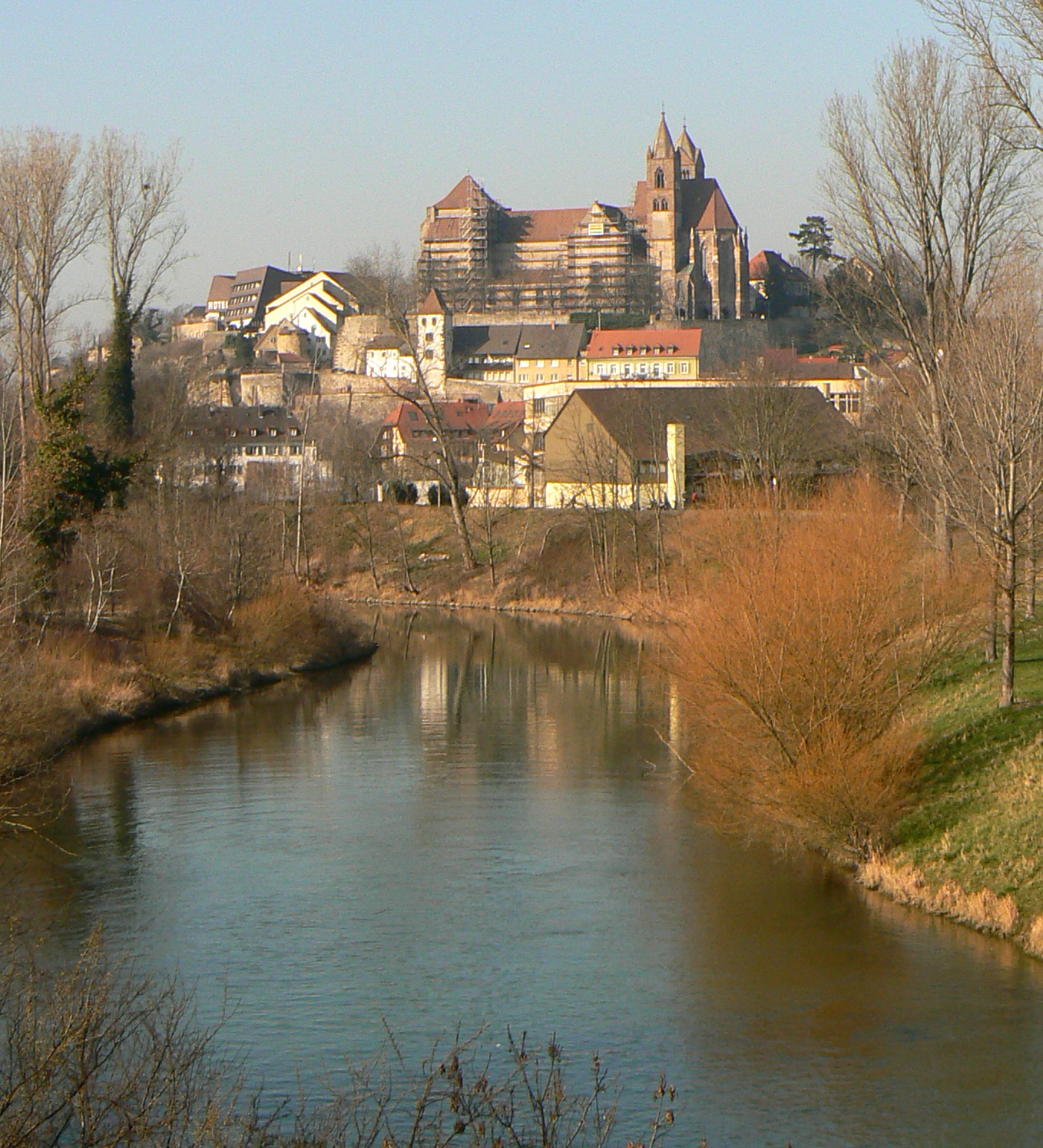
- The Möhlin in Breisach

Location
- Country: Germany
- State: Baden-Württemberg
- Reference no.: DE: 2336

Physical characteristics
- Source
  - location: Source region: above St. Ulrich's Priory in the Black Forest from several hillside springs
  - elevation: ca. 1,080 m above sea level (NN)
- Mouth
  - location: At Breisach into the Rhine
  - coordinates: 48°01′31″N 7°34′48″E
  - elevation: 188 m above sea level (NN)
- Length: 32.0 km (19.9 mi)
- Basin size: 219 km^{2} (85 sq mi)
- Discharge
  - average: 533 L/s
  - minimum: Average low: 65 L/s
  - maximum: Average high: 8.70 m^{3}/s Record high: 31.79 m^{3}/s (in 1994)

Basin features
- Progression: Rhine→ North Sea
- Landmarks: Small towns: Bad Krozingen, Breisach; Villages: Bollschweil, Ehrenkirchen
- Tributaries
  - left: Neumagen

Möhlin is a river of Baden-Württemberg, Germany. It is a tributary of the Rhine at Breisach.

== See also ==
- List of rivers of Baden-Württemberg
