= Matern von Marschall =

German politician

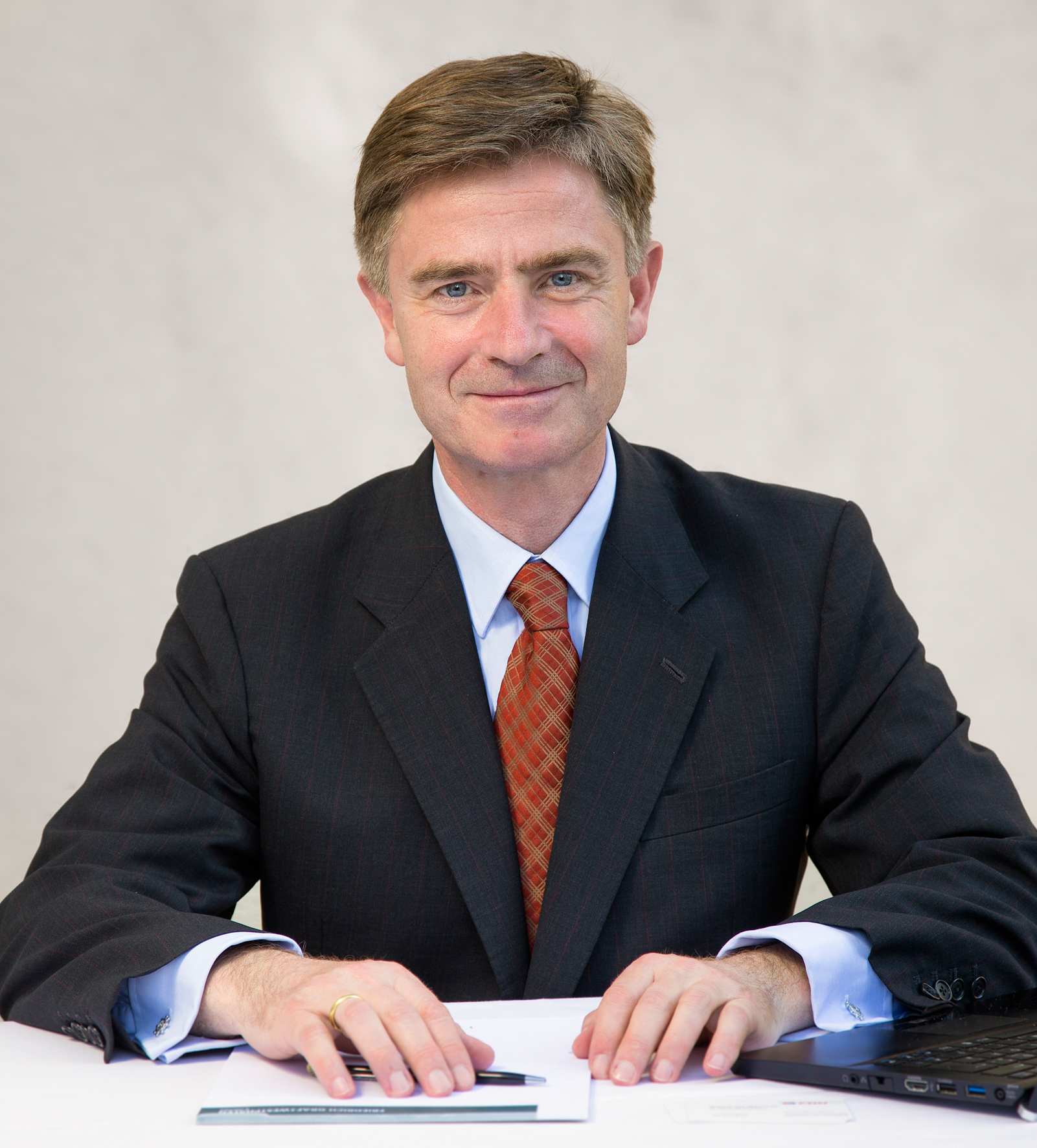
- Matern von Marschall in 2013

Member of the Bundestag; for Freiburg
- In office 22 October 2013 – 26 October 2021
- Preceded by: Gernot Erler
- Succeeded by: Chantal Kopf

Personal details
- Born: 3 August 1962 (age 64) Freiburg im Breisgau, West Germany
- Party: Christian Democratic Union
- Relatives: Adolf Marschall von Bieberstein (great-grandfather)

Matern von Marschall (born 3 August 1962) is a German politician of the Christian Democratic Union (CDU) who served as a member of the Bundestag from the state of Baden-Württemberg from 2013 until 2021.

== Political career ==
Von Marschall first became a member of the Bundestag in the 2013 German federal election. He was a member of the Committee on European Union Affairs and the Committee on Economic Cooperation and Development.

In addition to his committee assignments, von Marschall was a member of the German delegation to the Parliamentary Assembly of the Council of Europe (PACE) from 2018 until 2021. In this capacity, he served on the Assembly's Committee on Rules of Procedure, Immunities and Institutional Affairs; the Committee on Social Affairs, Health and Sustainable Development; and the Sub-Committee on Public Health and Sustainable Development. From 2019 until 2021, he was also a member of the German delegation to the Franco-German Parliamentary Assembly.

== Other activities ==
- Deutsche Gesellschaft für Internationale Zusammenarbeit (GIZ), Chairman of the Board of Trustees
- German Institute for Development Evaluation (DEval), Member of the Advisory Board
- Franco-German Youth Office (FGYO), Member of the Board of Governors (since 2018)
- Rotary International, Member

== Political positions ==
In June 2017, von Marschall voted against Germany's introduction of same-sex marriage.

Ahead of the 2021 national elections, von Marschall endorsed Markus Söder as the Christian Democrats' joint candidate to succeed Chancellor Angela Merkel.
