= Patrick Rapp =

German politician (born 1969)

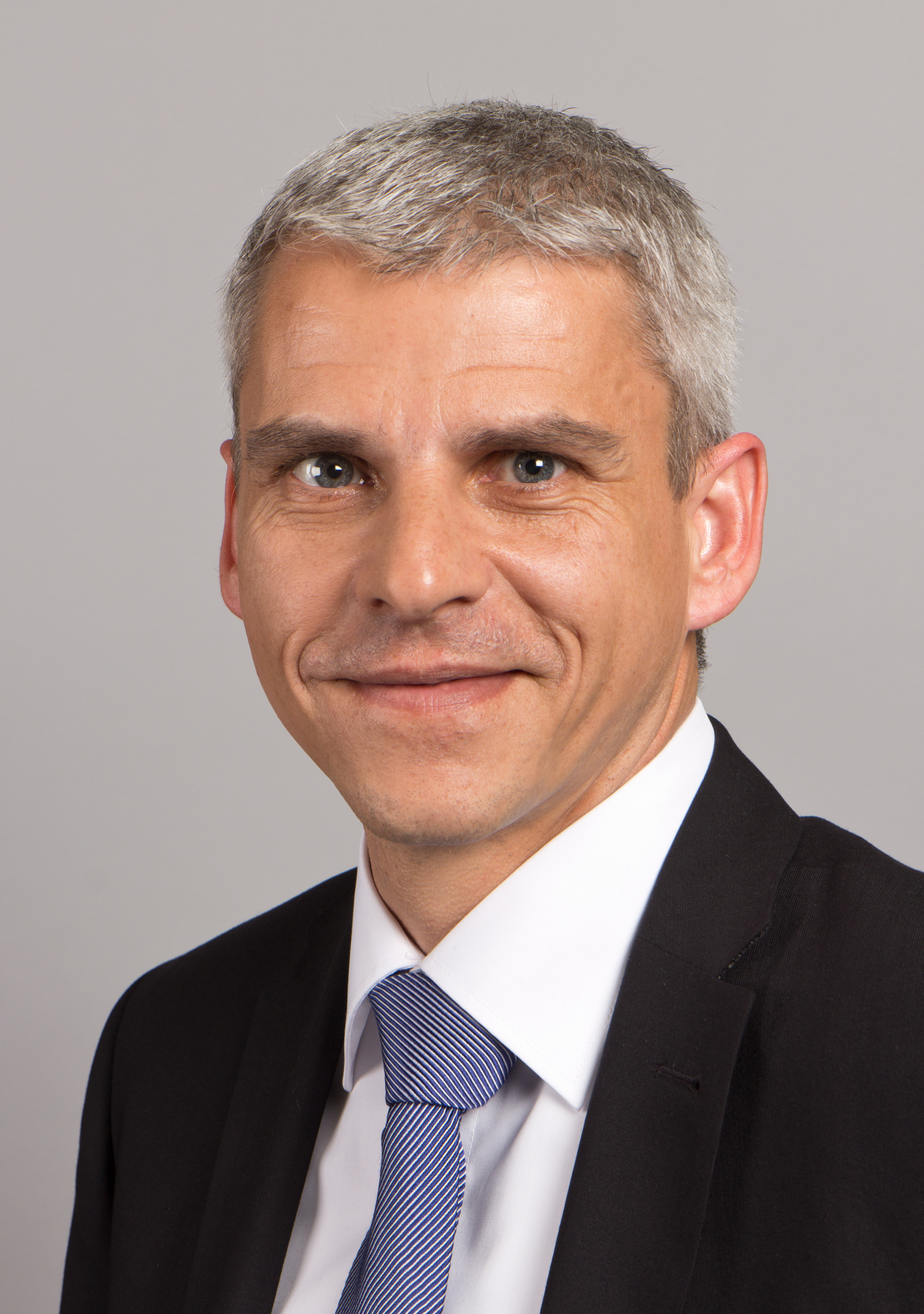
- Rapp in 2013

Member of the Landtag of Baden-Württemberg
- Incumbent
- Assumed office 1 May 2011
- Constituency: Breisgau

Personal details
- Born: 28 January 1969 (age 57) Stuttgart
- Party: Christian Democratic Union (since 1985)

Patrick Rapp (born 28 January 1969 in Stuttgart) is a German politician serving as a member of the Landtag of Baden-Württemberg since 2011. He has served as state secretary of economic affairs, labour and tourism of Baden-Württemberg since 2021.
