= Neumagen =

River in Germany

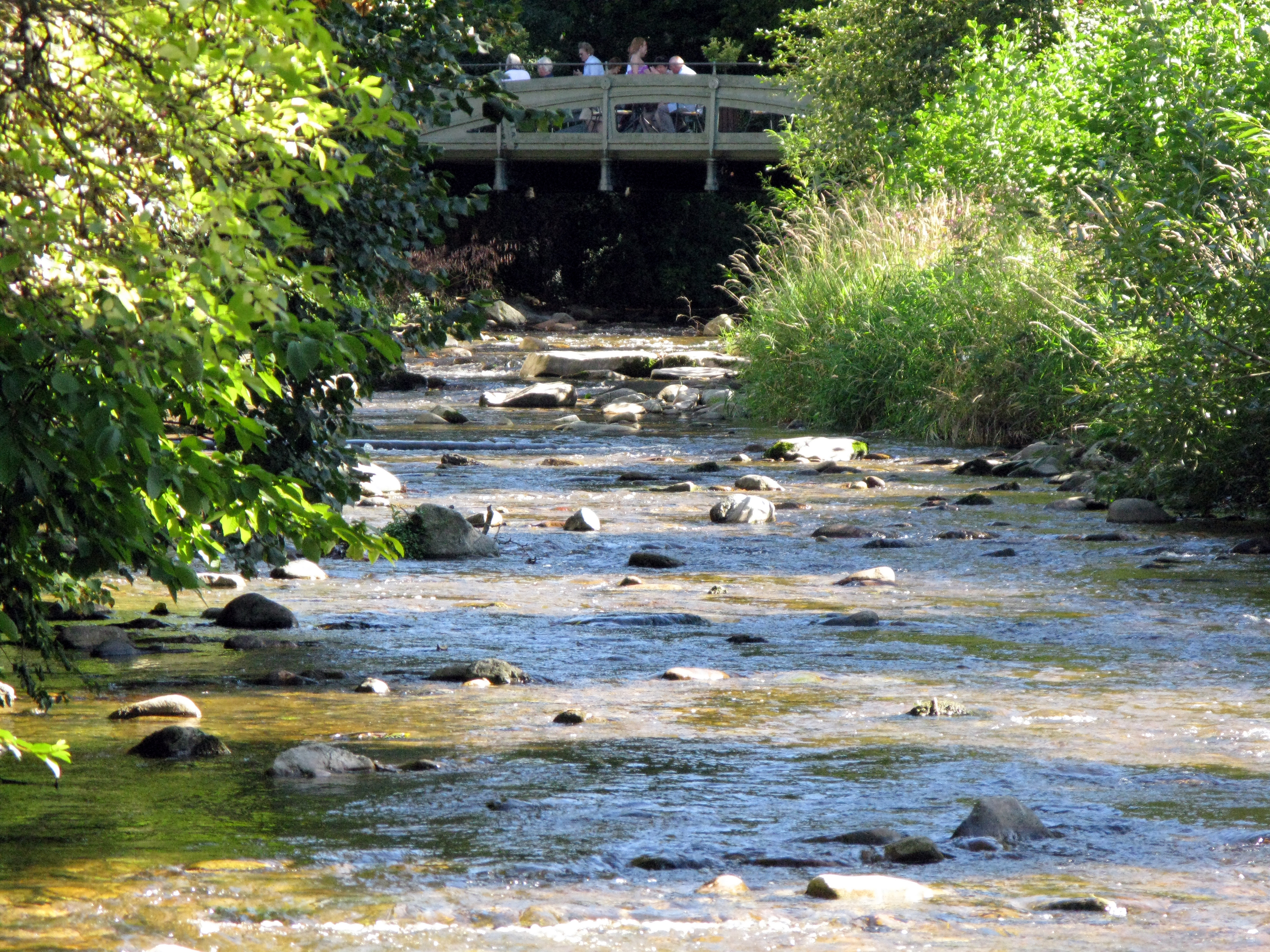

Location
- Country: Germany
- State: Baden-Württemberg

Physical characteristics
- Mouth
  - location: Möhlin
  - coordinates: 47.9494°N 7.6725°E
- Length: 25.9 km (16.1 mi)

Basin features
- Progression: Möhlin→ Rhine→ North Sea

Neumagen is a river of Baden-Württemberg, Germany. It is a left tributary of the Möhlin near Bad Krozingen.

== See also ==
- List of rivers of Baden-Württemberg
