= Charlotte Schneidewind-Hartnagel =

German politician (born 1953)

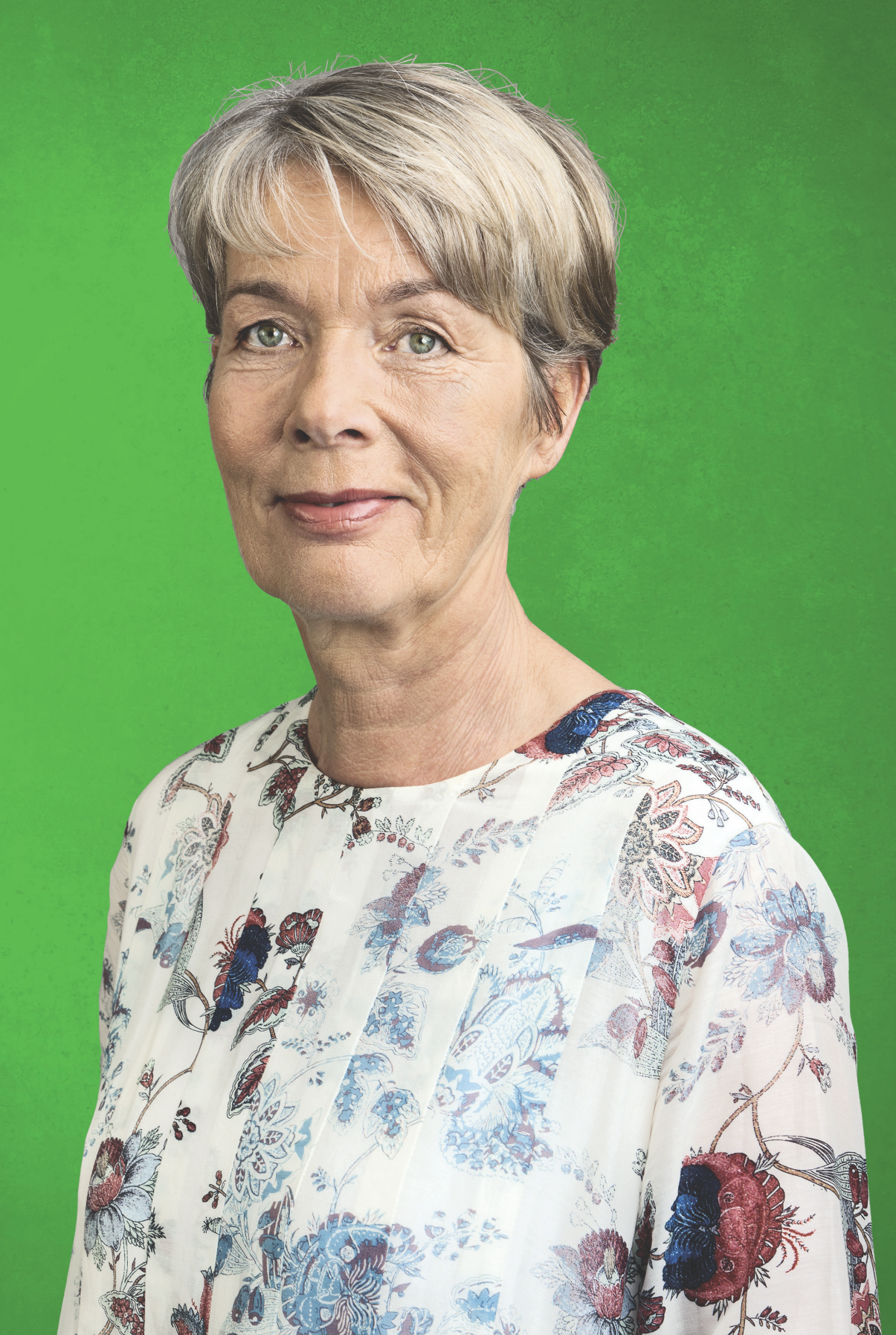
- Charlotte Schneidewind-Hartnagel in 2017

Member of the Bundestag
- In office 1 November 2019 – 26 September 2021
- Preceded by: Kerstin Andreae

Personal details
- Born: 2 September 1953 (age 72) Göttingen, West Germany (now Germany)
- Party: Greens
- Children: 1

Charlotte Schneidewind-Hartnagel (born 2 September 1953) is a German politician. Born in Göttingen, Lower Saxony, she is a member of the Alliance 90/The Greens. Schneidewind-Hartnagel served as a member of the Bundestag from the state of Baden-Württemberg from 2019 to 2021.

== Life ==
After graduating from the Old Electoral Grammar School in Bensheim in 1973, Schneidewind-Hartnagel began studying German, English and journalism at the Georg-August University in Göttingen. In 1978 she took up an editorial traineeship at the Berlin publisher Agora-Verlag. Later she worked in Worpswede and Bensheim. From 1986 to 1989 she studied business administration at the University of Applied Sciences Rhineland-Palatinate in Worms (degree: Diplom-Betriebswirtin). Afterwards she worked at the press office of the Federal Association of German Freight Transport in Frankfurt am Main, as press officer of the Women's Representative in Bensheim and as a freelance journalist. She succeeded Kerstin Andreae in the Bundestag on 1 November 2019. She is a member of the Children's Commission and the Committee for Family, Senior Citizens, Women and Youth.
