= Chantal Kopf =

German politician (born 1995)

Chantal Kopf MdB

Member of the Bundestag; for Freiburg
- Incumbent
- Assumed office 26 October 2021
- Preceded by: Matern von Marschall

Personal details
- Born: 20 March 1995 (age 31) Baden-Baden, Germany
- Party: Alliance 90/The Greens
- Education: University of Freiburg

Chantal Kopf (born 20 March 1995) is a German politician of the Alliance 90/The Greens who has been serving as a member of the Bundestag after the 2021 German federal election. representing the electoral district of Freiburg.

== Early career ==
During her studies, Kopf managed the Freiburg office of Kerstin Andreae.

== Political career ==
In the negotiations to form a coalition government under the leadership of Minister-President of Baden-Württemberg Winfried Kretschmann following the 2021 state elections, Kopf was part of the working group on European and international affairs, led by Theresa Schopper and Daniel Caspary.

In parliament, Kopf serves on the Committee on European Affairs. In addition to her committee assignments, she has been a member of the German delegation to the Franco-German Parliamentary Assembly since 2022. She is also part of the German-Swiss Parliamentary Friendship Group.

== Other activities ==
- University of Freiburg, Member of the Advisory Board
