= Eschbach, Baden-Württemberg =

Eschbach
- Municipality
- Coat of arms

- Location of Eschbach within Breisgau-Hochschwarzwald district
- Interactive map of Eschbach
- Location within Germany Location within Baden-Württemberg
- Coordinates: 47°53′24″N 07°39′18″E
- Country: Germany
- State: Baden-Württemberg
- Admin. region: Freiburg
- District: Breisgau-Hochschwarzwald

Government
  - Mayor (2023–31): Sarah Michaelis

Area
  - Total: 10.03 km^{2} (3.87 sq mi)
- Elevation: 246 m (807 ft)

Population (2025-12-31)
  - Total: 2,464
  - Density: 245.7/km^{2} (636.3/sq mi)
- Time zone: UTC+01:00 (CET)
  - Summer (DST): UTC+02:00 (CEST)
- Postal codes: 79427
- Dialling codes: 07634
- Vehicle registration: FR
- Website: www.gemeinde-eschbach.de

Eschbach (German pronunciation: [ˈɛʃbax]) is a municipality in the Breisgau-Hochschwarzwald district, Baden-Württemberg, Germany.

== Etymology ==
The toponym Eschbach is a composed word consisting of the German words Esche (ash tree) and Bach (brook). However, the settlement is first mentioned in a document of the Abbey of Saint Gall of 807 under the name Ascabah. Asca is Old High German meaning burnt ash. On the other hand, the Geographical Dictionary of the Archive of Baden-Württemberg relates it to aspa (Old High German for aspen).

== Weinstetten ==
Weinstetten is a vanished village on the territory of Eschbach which was mentioned for the first time in 896 as Vizzilistat and was destroyed by the flood of the Rhine in 1482.

=== Weinstetter Hof ===
Only the farmhouse which has since been called Weinstetter Hof to the north of the former village was spared from the flood. In 1271 the Lords of Üsenberg had sold the estate to the Knights of Saint John of Freiburg. Around 1606 the Prince Grand Prior of Rosenbach built the mansion. It was restored in 2012.

== Reading ==
- Journal Das Markgräflerland, 2/2010 with three articles about Eschbach
- Weinstetter Hof, booklet of 24 pages with fotos and detailed information
