= Niedensteiner Kopf =

Castle in Hesse, Germany

Coordinates: 51°14′N 9°19′E

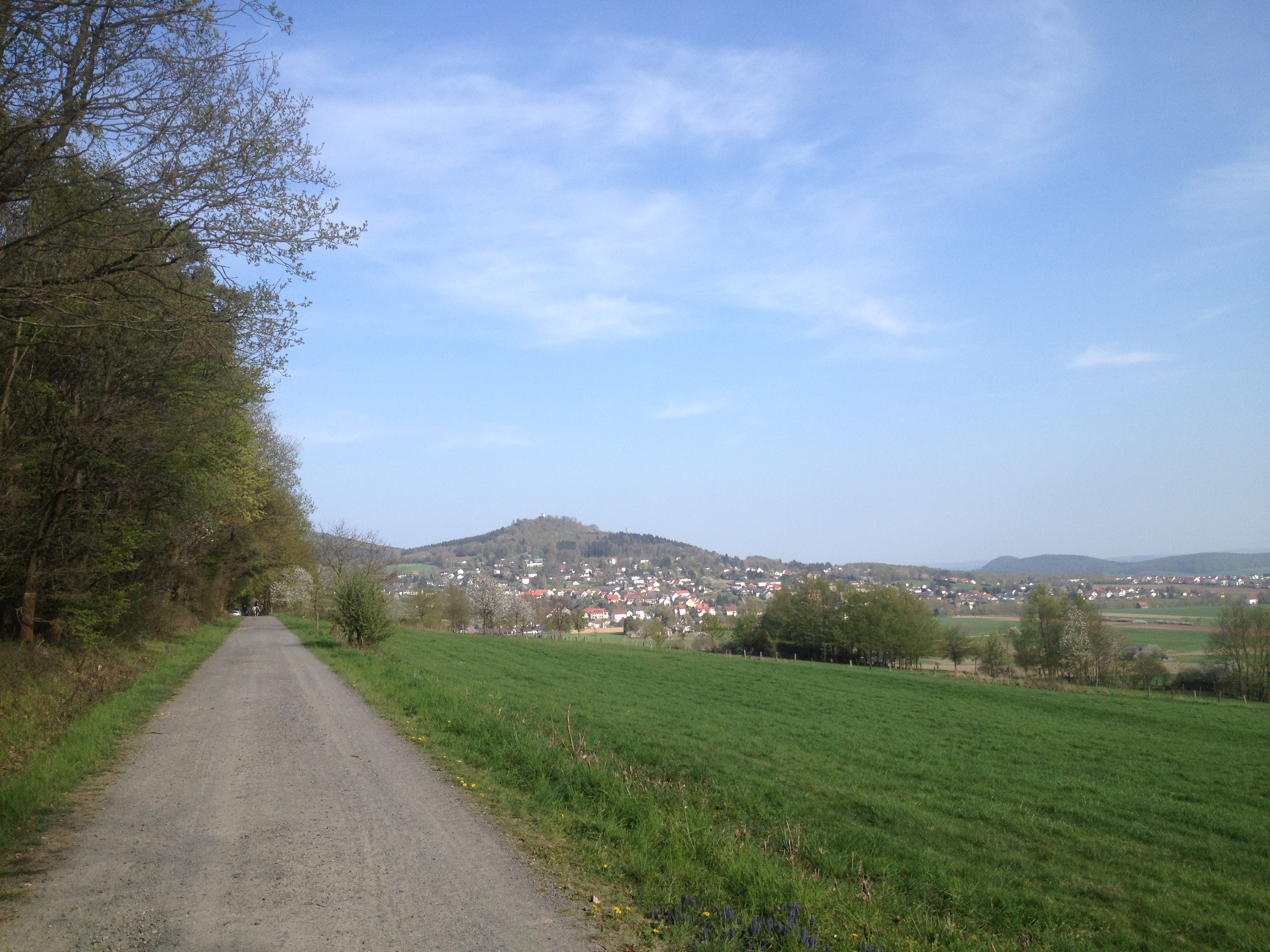
- A distant view of Niedensteiner Kopf

Highest point
- Elevation: 475 m (1,558 ft)

Geography
- Location: Schwalm-Eder-Kreis, Hesse, Germany

Niedensteiner Kopf is a hill of Schwalm-Eder-Kreis, Hesse, Germany.
