= Grüningen Priory =

Priory in Breisach, Germany

Grüningen Priory was a short-lived Cluniac foundation, predecessor to St. Ulrich's Priory in the Black Forest, at Grüningen(de) near Oberrimsingen in Breisach in the district of Breisgau-Hochschwarzwald, Baden-Württemberg, Germany.

== History ==
A small monastery, Tuniberg Priory (Kloster Tuniberg), apparently Benedictine, was founded sometime before 1072 on the mountain known as the Tuniberg near the Kaiserstuhl by Hesso of Eichstetten and Rimsingen. This was moved between 1077 and 1080 to Grüningen.

With the founder's consent, Ulrich of Zell (d. 1093), in his advancement of the Cluniac reforms in German territory, turned it into a priory directly dependent on Cluny Abbey.

At his instigation the community moved yet again in about 1087, this time to Zell in the Möhlin valley, where it developed into St. Ulrich's Priory in the Black Forest.
