= Hermann Kopf =

German politician (1901–1991)

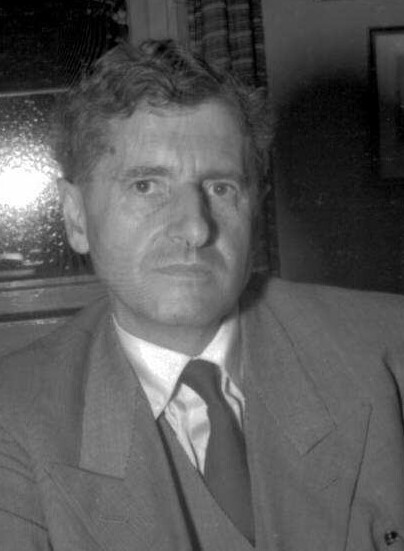
- Kopf in 1957

Member of the Bundestag; for Freiburg
- In office 7 September 1949 – 19 October 1969
- Preceded by: Constituency established
- Succeeded by: Hans Evers

Personal details
- Born: 29 May 1901 Freiburg im Breisgau, Germany
- Died: 5 May 1991 (aged 89) Freiburg im Breisgau, Germany
- Party: Christian Democratic Union
- Children: 2
- Education: University of Freiburg

Hermann Kopf (29 May 1901 – 5 May 1991) was a German politician of the Christian Democratic Union (CDU) and former member of the German Bundestag.

== Career ==
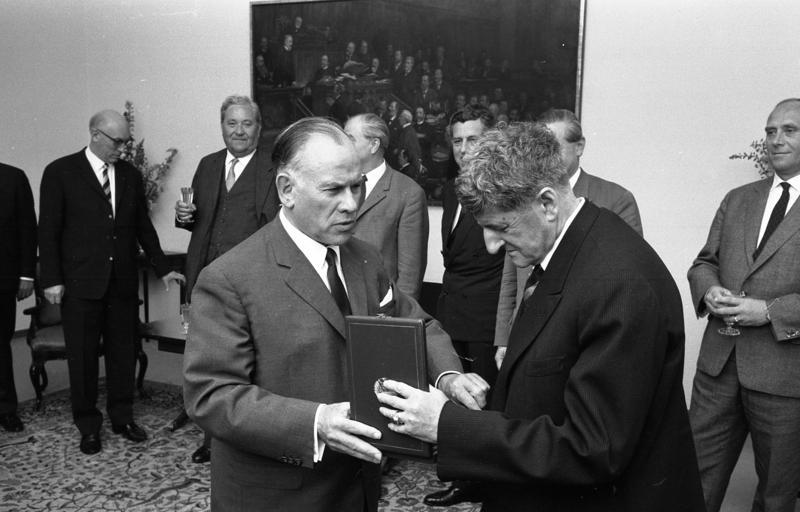
Grand Federal Cross of Merit with Star for Hermann Kopf (right)

He was a member of the German Bundestag from its first election in 1949 to 1969. He was directly elected in all ballots in the Freiburg constituency. From 25 May 1960 to 1969 he was Chairman of the Bundestag Committee on Foreign Affairs.

From 16 July 1952 to 29 November 1961, Kopf was also a member of the European Parliament.
