= Bundesverband der Energie- und Wasserwirtschaft =

The Bundesverband der Energie- und Wasserwirtschaft (BDEW) e.V. (German Association of Energy and Water Industries) with headquarters in Berlin is the German business organisation for the energy (power producers, grid operators, natural gas, electricity and district heating) and water industry (water supply and sanitation). BDEW influences the German energy policy and is a proponent of free-market designs. Depending on the sources, BDEW represents over 1800 or even 1900 companies, including local and municipal utilities as well as regional and inter-regional suppliers. Among the big players in the association are E.ON, Vattenfall, EnBW and RWE.
