= Kerstin Andreae =

German politician (born 1968)

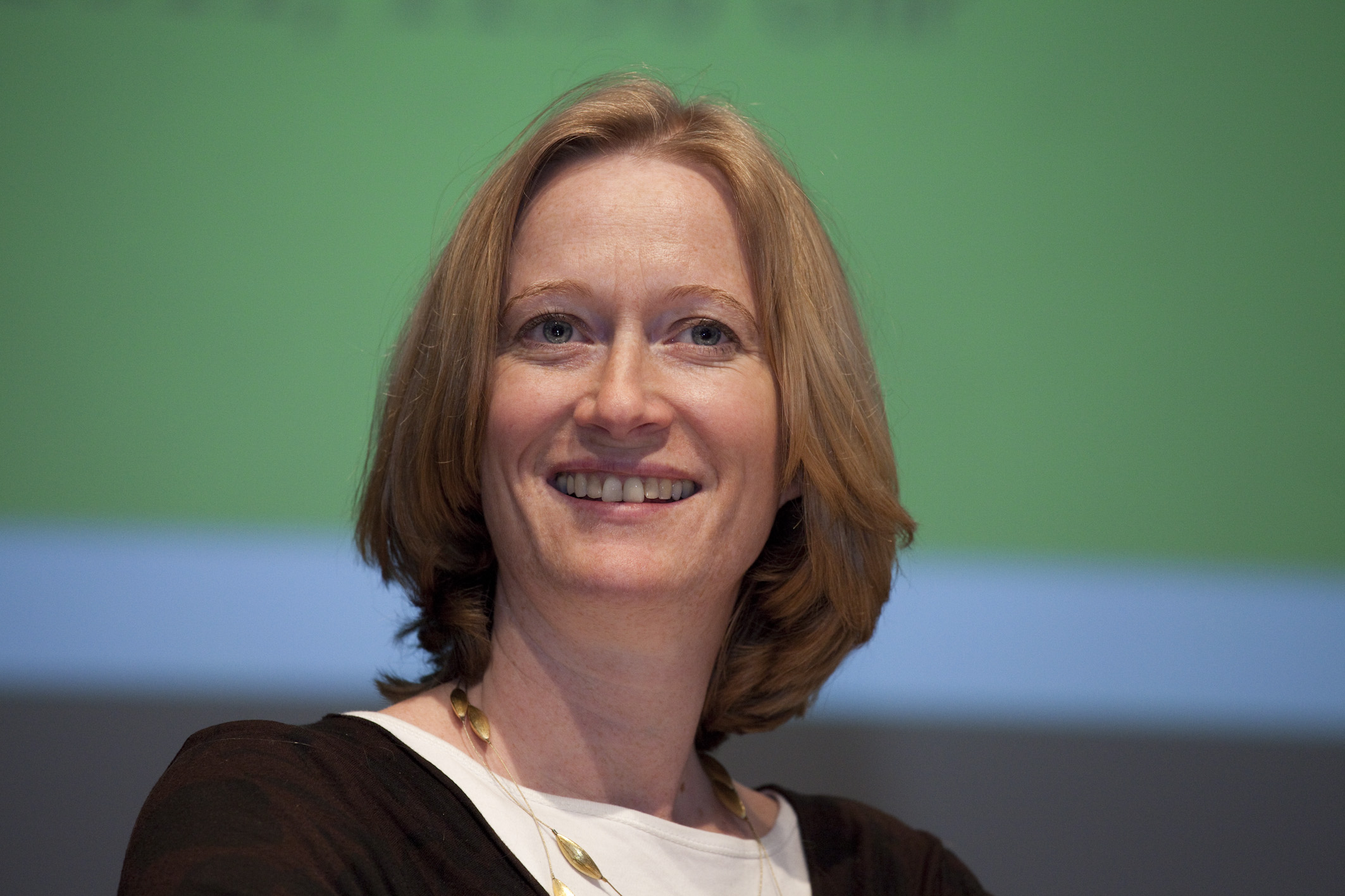
- Andreae in 2011

Member of the Bundestag
- In office 2002–2019
- Succeeded by: Charlotte Schneidewind-Hartnagel

Personal details
- Born: 21 October 1968 (age 58) Schramberg, Baden-Württemberg, West Germany
- Party: Alliance '90/The Greens
- Education: University of Freiburg

Kerstin Andreae (born 21 October 1968) is a German politician of Alliance '90/The Greens who served as Member of the Bundestag from 2002 to 2019. Since leaving politics, she has been serving as managing director of the German Association of Energy and Water Industries (BDEW).

== Early life and education ==
Andreae was born on 21 October 1968 in Schramberg, Baden-Württemberg.

After graduating from high school in 1988, she studied political science and economics at the University of Freiburg. In 1998 she worked as press secretary and campaign manager to Wilfried Telkämper, then a Member of the European Parliament.

== Political career ==
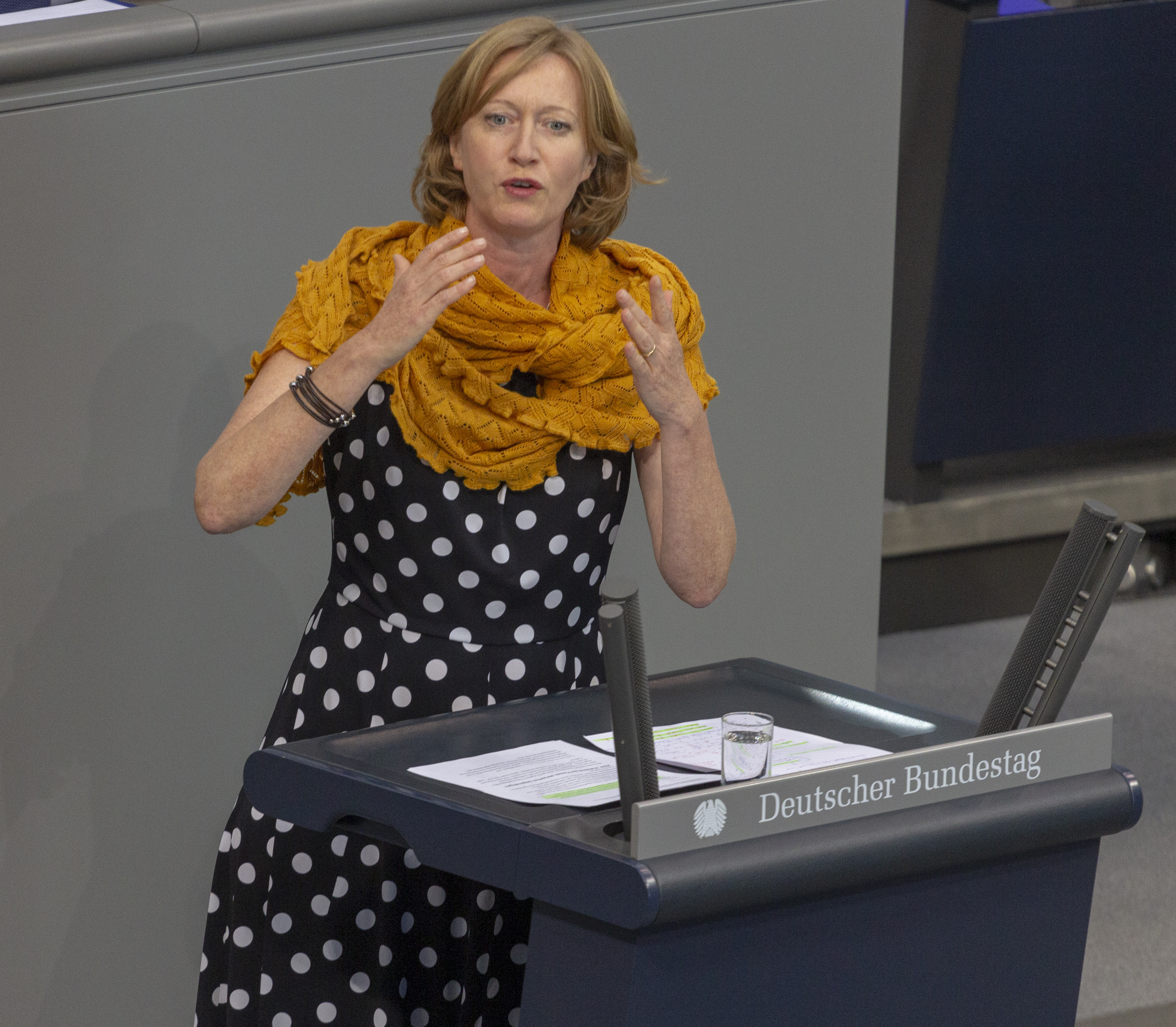
Kerstin Andreae, 2019

From 1999 to 2002, Andreae was a member of the city council in Freiburg im Breisgau.

In 2002, Andreae was first elected into the German Bundestag. Between 2005 and 2007, she served as the Green parliamentary groups’ coordinator in the Finance Committee. From March 2007 to March 2012 she was the groups’ spokesperson for economic affairs and coordinator in the Committee on Economic Affairs and Technology. In 2012, she succeeded Fritz Kuhn as the group's deputy chairperson, at the time led by co-chairs Renate Künast and Jürgen Trittin.

After the 2013 federal elections, Andreae — who is considered a centrist in her party — unsuccessfully tried to become the chairwoman of the Green's parliamentary group. Commentators regarded her loss against Katrin Göring-Eckardt as a sign that Green lawmakers rejected a chance to reach out to Angela Merkel’s CDU as a possible coalition partner. In 2019, she set up the group’s business advisory board, a gathering of around 50 corporate leaders from different sectors.

In 2019, Andreae was appointed as managing director of the German Association of Energy and Water Industries (BDEW).

== Political positions ==
=== Economic policy ===
In late 2013, when the government announced its plan to significantly increase social expenditures for the current generation of pensioners, Andreae called this a "flagrant pillaging of pension funds" and a "socially unjust" burden on lower- and middle-income individuals.

In 2014, Andreae criticised the government's approval of utility group RWE selling its oil and gas unit RWE Dea to investors led by Russia's second-richest man Mikhail Fridman.

=== Human rights ===
In August 2012, Andreae was one of 124 members of the Bundestag to sign a letter that was sent to the Russian ambassador to Germany, Vladimir Grinin, expressing concern over the trial against the three members of Pussy Riot. “Being held in detention for months and the threat of lengthy punishment are Draconian and disproportionate,” the lawmakers said in the letter. “In a secular and pluralist state, peaceful artistic acts -- even if they can be seen as provocative -- must not lead to the accusation of serious criminal acts that lead to lengthy prison terms.”

== Other activities ==
=== Government agencies ===
- Federal Network Agency for Electricity, Gas, Telecommunications, Posts and Railway (BNetzA), Member of the Advisory Board
- KfW, Member of the Board of Supervisory Directors (2015-2017)

=== Non-profit organizations ===
- Agora Energiewende, Member of the Council (since 2019)
- Baden-Badener Unternehmer-Gespräche (BBUG), Member of the Board of Trustees
- Evangelical Church in Germany (EKD), Member of the Committee on the Social Order
- European Academy for Women in Politics and Business, Member of the Board of Trustees
- German Industry Initiative for Energy Efficiency (DENEFF), Member of the Parliamentary Advisory Board
- Progressives Zentrum, Member of the Circle of Friends
- Protestant University for Applied Sciences Freiburg, Member of the Advisory Board
- Robert Bosch United World College, Member of the Board of Trustees
- University of Freiburg, Member of the Advisory Board
