= Ballrechten-Dottingen =

- Municipality
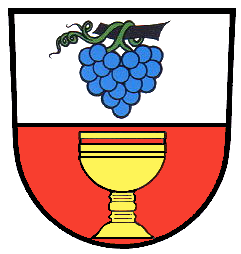
- Coat of arms

- Location of Ballrechten-Dottingen within Breisgau-Hochschwarzwald district
- Interactive map of Ballrechten-Dottingen
- Location within Germany Location within Baden-Württemberg
- Coordinates: 47°51′32″N 7°41′51″E
- Country: Germany
- State: Baden-Württemberg
- Admin. region: Freiburg
- District: Breisgau-Hochschwarzwald

Government
  - Mayor (2019–27): Patrick Becker

Area
  - Total: 6.62 km^{2} (2.56 sq mi)
- Elevation: 332 m (1,089 ft)

Population (2025-12-31)
  - Total: 2,488
  - Density: 376/km^{2} (973/sq mi)
- Time zone: UTC+01:00 (CET)
  - Summer (DST): UTC+02:00 (CEST)
- Postal codes: 79282
- Dialling codes: 07634
- Vehicle registration: FR
- Website: www.ballrechten-dottingen.de

Ballrechten-Dottingen is a municipality in Markgräflerland in the southwest of Germany. It is situated at the western edge of Black Forest.
