= Gernot Erler =

German politician

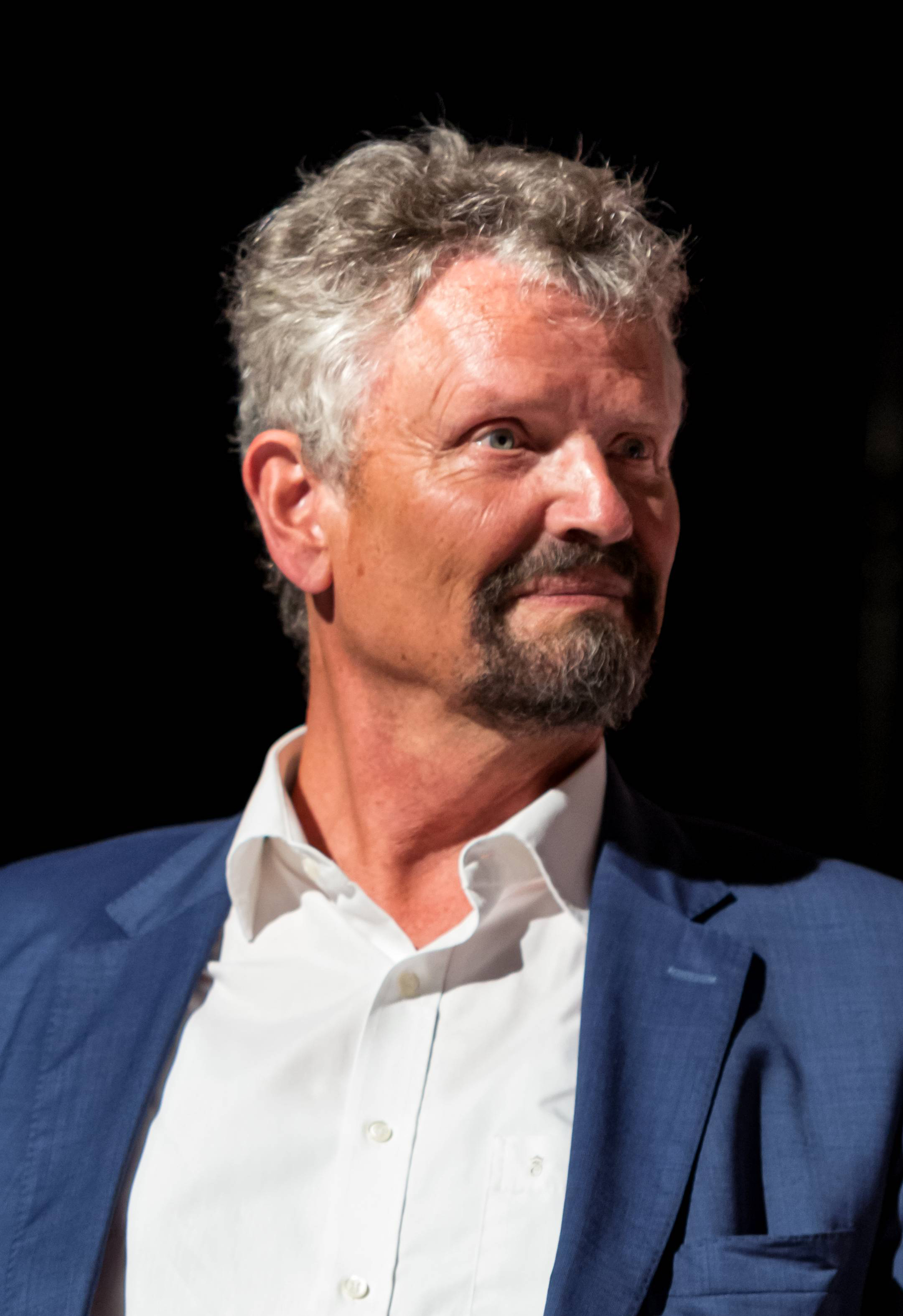

Minister of State at the Federal Foreign Office
- In office 22 November 2005 – 28 October 2009
- Minister: Frank-Walter Steinmeier
- Preceded by: Kerstin Müller
- Succeeded by: Cornelia Pieper

Member of the Bundestag; from Baden-Württemberg
- In office 18 February 1987 – 24 October 2017
- Constituency: State list (1987–1998); Freiburg (1998–2013); State list (2013–2017)

Personal details
- Born: 3 May 1944 (age 82) Meissen, Germany
- Party: Social Democratic
- Children: 1
- Education: Free University of Berlin; University of Freiburg

Gernot Erler (born 3 May 1944) is a German politician (SPD) who was member of the Bundestag, the German parliament, from 1987 to 2017.

== Early life and education ==
Erler studied history, Slavic studies and political science in Berlin and Freiburg from 1963 to 1967.

== Political career ==
Erler first became a member of the German Bundestag in the 1987 national elections. Following the 1994 national elections, he joined the SPD parliamentary group's leadership around chairman Rudolf Scharping. From 1994 until 1998, he served as the chairman of the Subcommittee on Disarmament, Arms Control and Non-Proliferation.

In the negotiations to form a coalition government with the Christian Democrats under Chancellor Angela Merkel following the 2005 federal elections, Erler led the SPD delegation in the working group on foreign affairs; his counterpart from the CDU/CSU was Friedbert Pflüger. Under the leadership of minister Frank-Walter Steinmeier, he subsequently served as Minister of State (alongside Günter Gloser) at the Federal Foreign Office from 2005 to 2009. When the SPD returned into the opposition from 2009 until 2013, Erler served as deputy chairman of his parliamentary group, again under Steinmeier's leadership.

From 2014 until 2017, Erler served as the German government's Coordinator for Inter-Societal Cooperation with Russia, Central Asia and the Eastern Partnership Countries at the Federal Foreign Office. From 2015 until 2016, he assumed the position of Special Representative of Germany for the country's chairmanship of the Organization for Security and Co-operation in Europe (OSCE) in 2016, in addition to his other responsibilities.

== Other activities ==
- Development and Peace Foundation (SEF), Member of the Advisory Board
- European Leadership Network (ELN), Member of the Advisory Board
- Petersburger Dialog, Member
- University of Freiburg, Member of the Advisory Board
- German United Services Trade Union (ver.di), Member
