= Wiedemer Kopf =

Mountain in Bavaria, Germany

Coordinates: 47°24′N 10°25′E

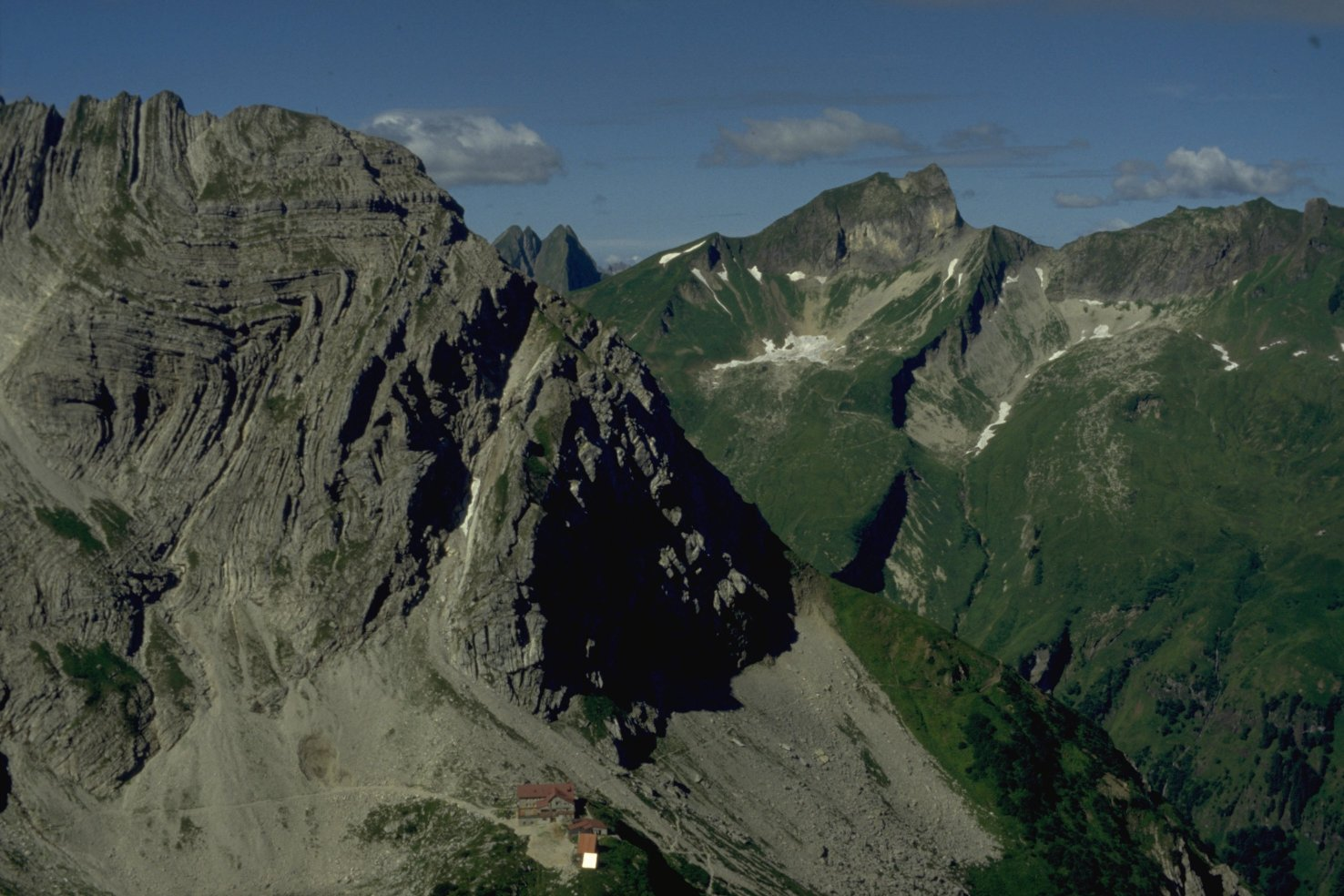
- Wiedemer Kopf from the northeast, including the Prince Luitpold House.

Highest point
- Elevation: 2,166 m (7,106 ft)
- Isolation: 0.07 km (0.043 mi) to P.2223

Geography
- Location: Bavaria, Germany

Wiedemer Kopf is a mountain of Bavaria, Germany.
