= Ulrich of Zell =

Cluniac reformer of Germany, abbot, founder and saint

Saint Ulrich of Zell
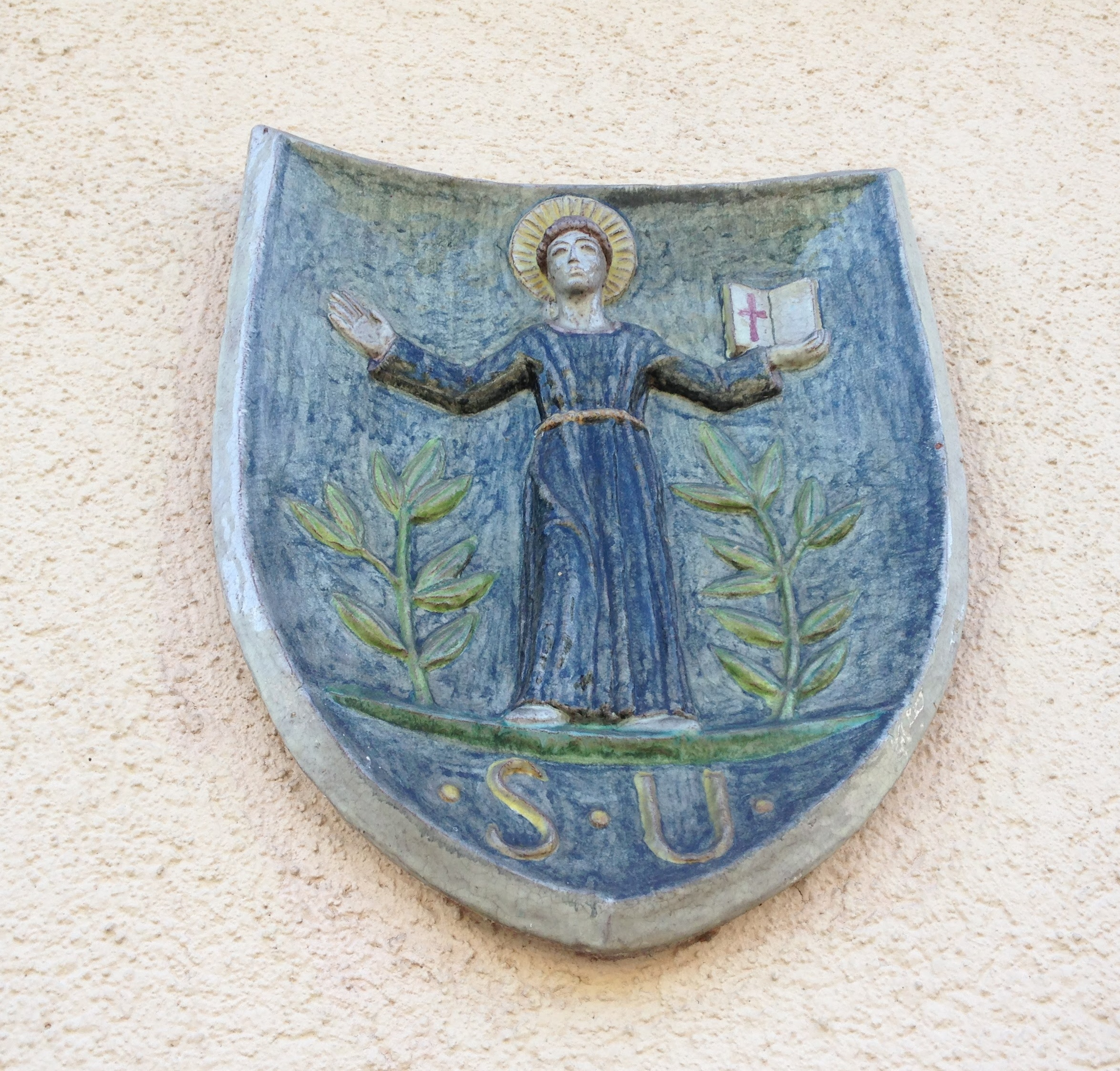

Abbot
- Born: c.1029 Regensburg, Bavaria, Germany
- Died: 10 July 1093; St. Ulrich im Schwarzwald, in Bollschweil, Germany
- Venerated in: Roman Catholic Church
- Beatified: 14 July 1139 (first celebration of feast day)
- Feast: 14 July

Ulrich of Zell, also known as Wulderic, sometimes of Cluny or of Regensburg (c. 1029 – 1093), was a Cluniac reformer of Germany, abbot, founder and saint.

== Life ==
Ulrich was born at Regensburg in Bavaria (formerly also known as Ratisbon) in early 1029. His father Bernhold was from Bavaria; his mother Bucca from Swabia, a niece of Bishop Gebhard II of Regensburg and also related to Ulrich of Augsburg. Pious and wealthy, they were childless for many years and made a pilgrimage to Magnus of Füssen, vowing to dedicate a son to the religious life.

Ulrich was probably educated at the school of St. Emmeram's Abbey, along with William of Hirsau, with whom he remained friends throughout his life, but in 1043 he was called to the court of his godfather, Henry III, King of the Germans where he acted as page to Queen Agnes, who was of the ducal house of Aquitaine, patrons of the reforming Abbey of Cluny. Ulrich later had to leave the court because his father had been accused of collaborating with enemies from Hungary and had been executed.

Ordained deacon by his uncle Nidger, Bishop of Freising, he was made archdeacon and provost of the cathedral there, but was deeply moved by the spirit of reform that was sweeping from Cluny through the 11th century church. On his return from a journey to Rome he distributed his possessions to the poor, made a pilgrimage to the Holy Land, and, after another short visit to Rome, returned to Regensburg, where he founded a religious community, and then entered the Abbey of Cluny in 1061. Here he soon became personal secretary to Abbot Hugo.

Here he was ordained priest and Hugo commissioned Ulrich to spread the Cluny reforms. He was appointed confessor to the convent at Mareigny in the diocese of Autun, and prior of the community of men in the same place. He also lost an eye and was obliged to return to Cluny.

== Later life ==
Om 1082 Ulrich was named prior at Peterlingen (now Payerne) in the Diocese of Lausanne. He took part in the synod in 1084 that elected Gebhard III, bishop of Basel. The following year, due to troubles with Bishop Burchard von Oltingen, a partisan of Henry IV, whom he had accused of breaking celibacy, Ulrich returned again to Cluny, where he acted as adviser to the abbot. Around 1072 Lütold of Rümligen granted to Cluny property and estates around Rüeggisberg. Ulrich as sent to establish a priory. During the construction period he lived in a cave, the "Pfaffenloch". Rüeggisberg became the first Cluniac priory in German-speaking lands. He then went to Augsburg to reform St. Ulrich's and St. Afra's Abbey. The project failed because the population drove Ulrich out of the city.

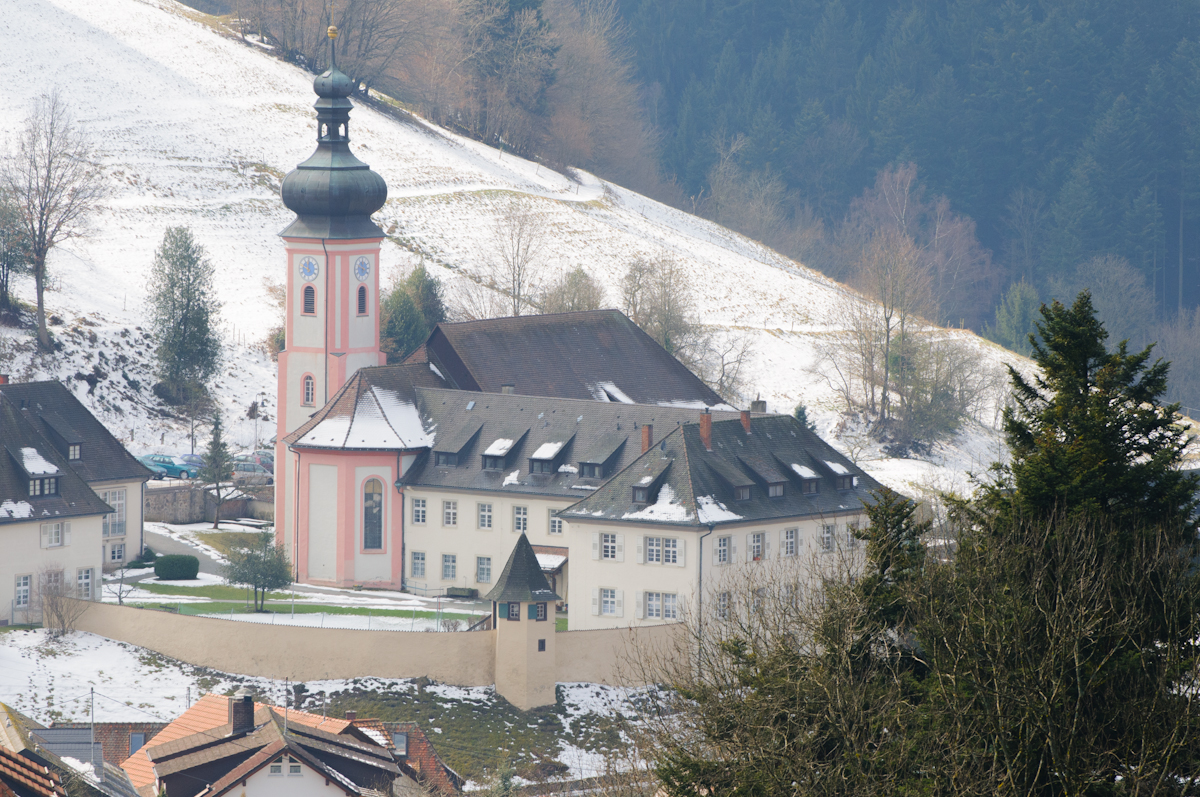
St. Ulrich im Schwarzwald

Ulrich took over an already existing monastic community, founded before 1072 on the Tuniberg by Hesso of Eichstetten and Rimsingen. sometime between 1077 and 1080 Kloster Tuniberg moved to Grüningen. Not finding the locality suitable, he and his monks moved in 1087 to Zell, in the Möhlin valley, where there had previously been a cell of the Abbey of Saint Gall. Ulrich's high reputation soon brought him many disciples. He enjoyed the good opinion of Bishop Gebhard, whom he probably helped in reforming the monastery of St. Alban. In 1090 he established Bollschweil Priory, a Cluniac nunnery at Bolesweiler (now Bollschweil), about a mile from Zell. Around 1090, Ulrich went blind, resigned as prior in St. Ulrich, but refused the offer to return to Cluny for the sake of better care.

He died at Zell, later known as St. Ulrich im Schwarzwald, probably on 10 July 1093. He was buried in the cloister, but three years later his body was brought into the church.

== Veneration ==
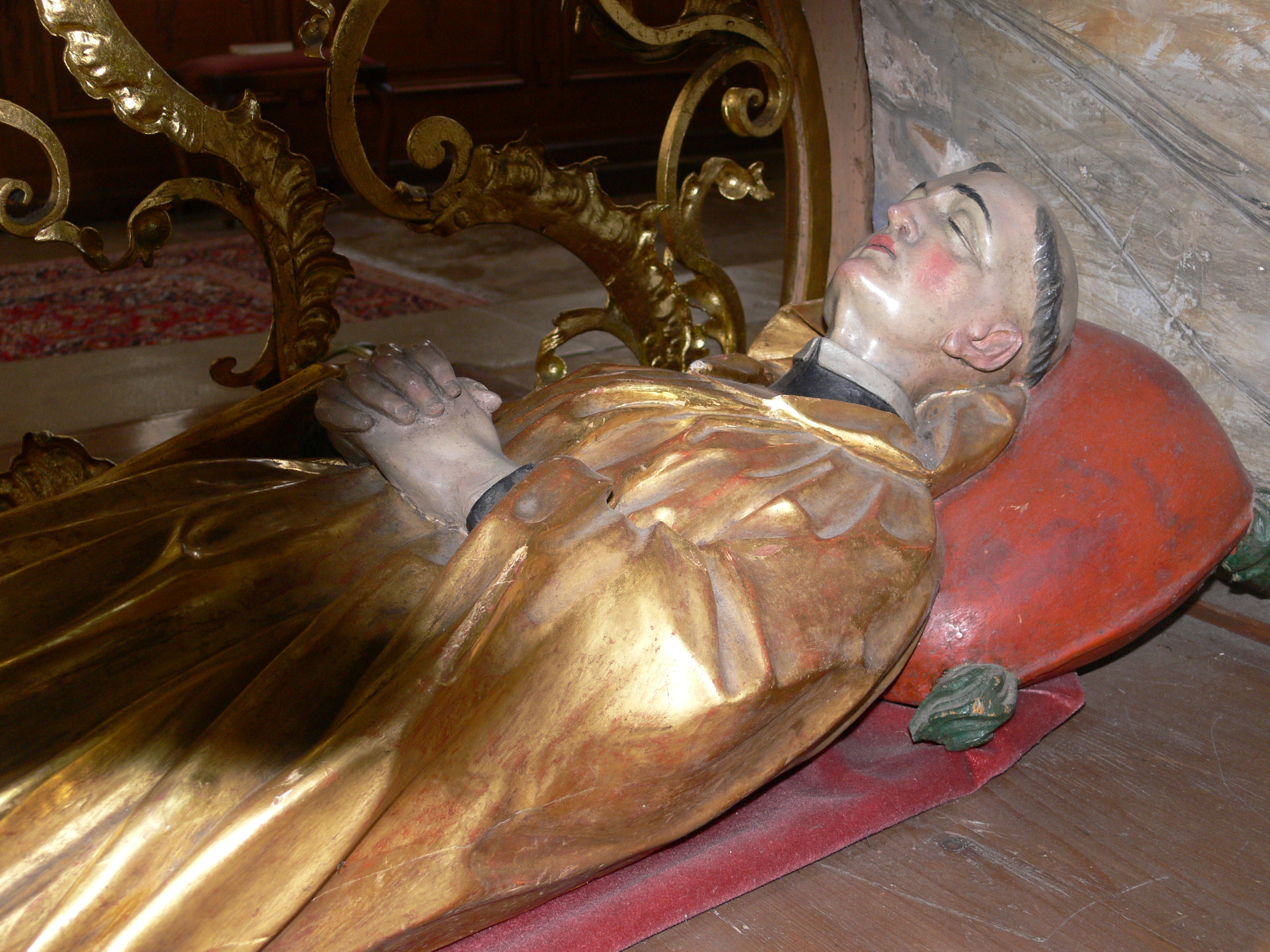
tomb of St Ulrich, Schwarzwald Pfarrkirche

Around 1300, the village of Zell was renamed St. Ulrich in honour of the monastery founder. Ulrich's memory is commemorated at the annual three-day festival in St. Ulrich with a varied programme.

His feast was celebrated for the first time on 14 July 1139, and 14 July remains his feast day.

== Works ==
His work Consuetudines cluniacenses ("Uses of Cluny") was composed at the request of William of Hirsau, in three books. The first two, written between 1079 and 1082, treat of liturgy and the education of novices; the third, written not later than 1087, speaks of the administration of monasteries.

His life of Hermann of Zähringen, Margrave of Baden, later a monk of Cluny, is lost.

== Biographies ==
Two biographies of him exist: the first (with selected passages from the "Vita posterior") was written anonymously around 1109 by a monk of Zell at the request of Adalbert, a recluse near Regensburg; the other (the Vita posterior), also anonymous, was written between 1109 and 1130. Particulars of his life are also contained in his writings.

== Literature ==
- Michael Buhlmann: Benediktinisches Mönchtum im mittelalterlichen Schwarzwald. Ein Lexikon. Vortrag beim Schwarzwaldverein St. Georgen e.V., St. Georgen im Schwarzwald, 10. November 2004, Teil 2: N–Z (= Vertex Alemanniae, H. 10/2), S. 102.
- Dieter Heck: Ulrich von Zell. Der Reform verpflichtet (Hagiographie/Ikonographie/Volkskunde; Nr. 105). Schnell + Steiner, München und Zürich 1992.
- Johannes Madey: Ulrich von Zell. In: Biographisch-Bibliographisches Kirchenlexikon (BBKL). Band 19, Bautz, Nordhausen 2001, ISBN 3-88309-089-1, Sp. 1453–1455.
- Florian Lamke: Cluniazenser am Oberrhein. Konfliktlösungen und adlige Gruppenbildung in der Zeit des Investiturstreits (= Forschungen zur oberrheinischen Landesgeschichte, Bd. 54), Freiburg / München 2009, bes. S. 136–152.
- Wolfgang Müller: St. Ulrich. In: Die Benediktinerklöster in Baden-Württemberg. (= Germania Benedictina, Bd. 5), Ottobeuren 1976, S. 615
- E. Tremp: Ulrich von Zell. In: Lexikon des Mittelalters (LexMA). Band 8, LexMA-Verlag, München 1997, ISBN 3-89659-908-9, Sp. 1205–1026.

== Sources ==
- Lexikon des Mittelalters, vol. 8, ed. E. Tremp, Stuttgart, 1997. "Ulrich von Zell"
