= Pfaffenweiler =

- Municipality
- Coat of arms

- Location of Pfaffenweiler within Breisgau-Hochschwarzwald district
- Interactive map of Pfaffenweiler
- Location within Germany Location within Baden-Württemberg
- Coordinates: 47°56′18″N 7°45′26″E
- Country: Germany
- State: Baden-Württemberg
- Admin. region: Freiburg
- District: Breisgau-Hochschwarzwald
- Subdivisions: 2

Government
  - Mayor (2022–30): Lukas Mahler

Area
  - Total: 3.61 km^{2} (1.39 sq mi)
- Elevation: 252 m (827 ft)

Population (2025-12-31)
  - Total: 2,623
  - Density: 727/km^{2} (1,880/sq mi)
- Time zone: UTC+01:00 (CET)
  - Summer (DST): UTC+02:00 (CEST)
- Postal codes: 79292
- Dialling codes: 07664
- Vehicle registration: FR
- Website: www.pfaffenweiler.de

Pfaffenweiler (High Alemannic: Pfaffewiiler) is a municipality in the district of Breisgau-Hochschwarzwald in Baden-Württemberg in southern Germany. The landscape here is shaped as much by vineyards as by history. Around 1850, over 200 inhabitants of Pfaffenweiler emigrated to the United States, and settled in Jasper, Indiana. Pfaffenweiler maintains a partnership with Jasper, as a part of which students are exchanged and several formal and informal visits are made.
