= Merdingen =

- Municipality
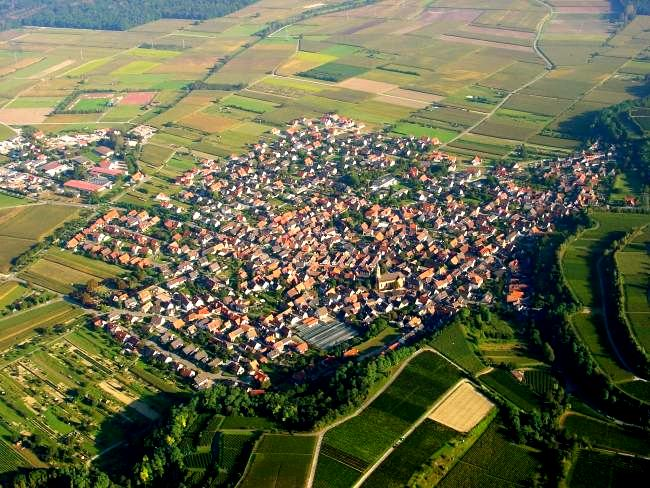

- Coat of arms

- Location of Merdingen within Breisgau-Hochschwarzwald district
- Interactive map of Merdingen
- Location within Germany Location within Baden-Württemberg
- Coordinates: 48°1′4″N 7°41′18″E
- Country: Germany
- State: Baden-Württemberg
- Admin. region: Freiburg
- District: Breisgau-Hochschwarzwald

Government
  - Mayor (2022–30): Martin Rupp

Area
  - Total: 14.39 km^{2} (5.56 sq mi)
- Elevation: 251 m (823 ft)

Population (2025-12-31)
  - Total: 2,661
  - Density: 184.9/km^{2} (478.9/sq mi)
- Time zone: UTC+01:00 (CET)
  - Summer (DST): UTC+02:00 (CEST)
- Postal codes: 79291
- Dialling codes: 07668
- Vehicle registration: FR
- Website: www.merdingen.de

Merdingen is a municipality in the district of Breisgau-Hochschwarzwald in Baden-Württemberg in Germany. Merdingen's main industry are vineyards. Tour de France winner Jan Ullrich, a notable resident for much of his early cycling career, has returned to the area in retirement—in part because it's one of the sunniest places in Germany.

== Demographics ==
Population development:

Year	Inhabitants
1990	2,311
2001	2,528
2011	2,553
2021	2,542
