= Ehrenkirchen =

German municipality

- Municipality
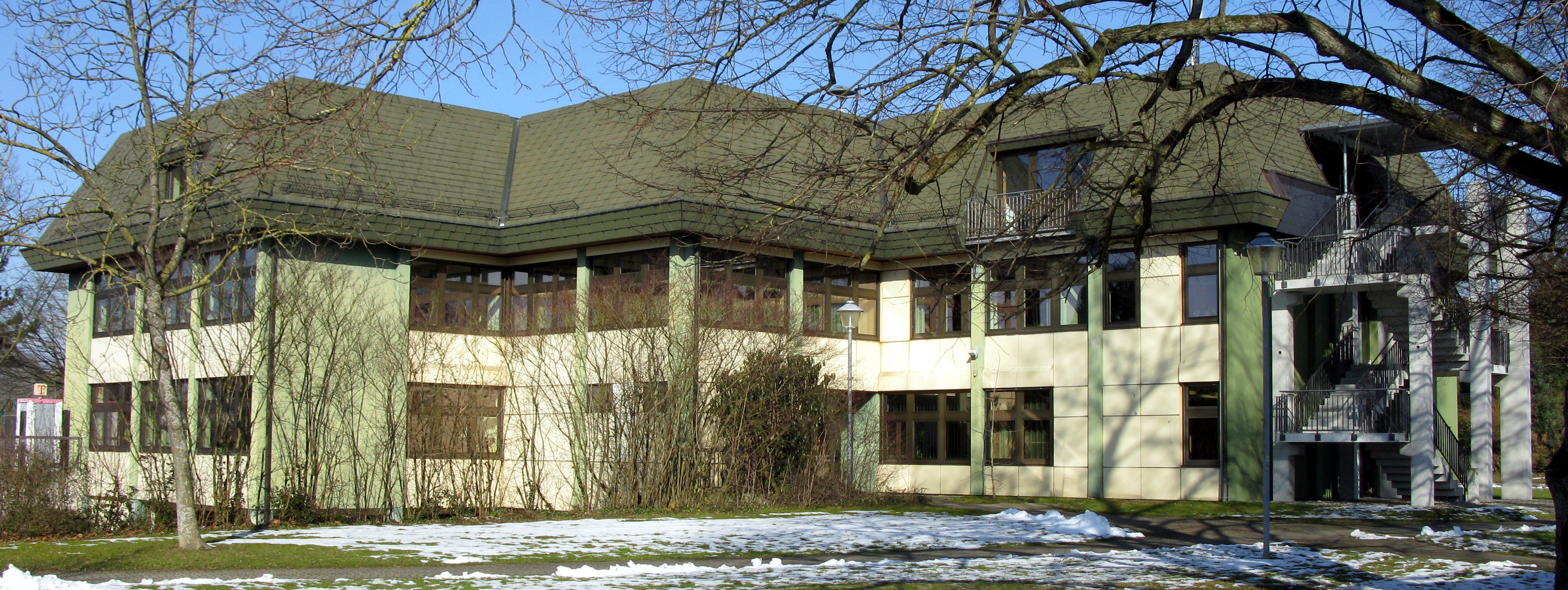
- Ehrenkirchen town hall

- Coat of arms

- Location of Ehrenkirchen within Breisgau-Hochschwaürzwald district
- Interactive map of Ehrenkirchen
- Location within Germany Location within Baden-Württemberg
- Coordinates: 47°54′55″N 7°45′7″E
- Country: Germany
- State: Baden-Württemberg
- Admin. region: Freiburg
- District: Breisgau-Hochschwaürzwald
- Subdivisions: 5

Area
  - Total: 37.80 km^{2} (14.59 sq mi)
- Elevation: 265 m (869 ft)

Population (2025-12-31)
  - Total: 7,855
  - Density: 207.8/km^{2} (538.2/sq mi)
- Time zone: UTC+01:00 (CET)
  - Summer (DST): UTC+02:00 (CEST)
- Postal codes: 79238
- Dialling codes: 07633
- Vehicle registration: FR
- Website: www.ehrenkirchen.de

Ehrenkirchen is a municipality in the district of Breisgau-Hochschwarzwald in Baden-Württemberg, Germany.

== History ==
The villages of Ehrenstetten, Kirchhofen, Norsingen, Offnadingen, and Scherzingen were properties of Saint Blaise Abbey, Black Forest until 1806, when they were mediatized to the Grand Duchy of Baden. They were assigned to the district of Staufen im Breisgau until 1936, when they were reassigned to the district of Freiburg im Breisgau. As part of the 1973 Baden-Württemberg district reform, they were assigned to the new district of Breisgau-Hochschwarzwald. Over 1973 and 1974, the five villages merged into a single municipality, Ehrenkirchen, whose name was a combination of the largest towns, Ehrenstetten and Kirchhofen.

== Geography ==
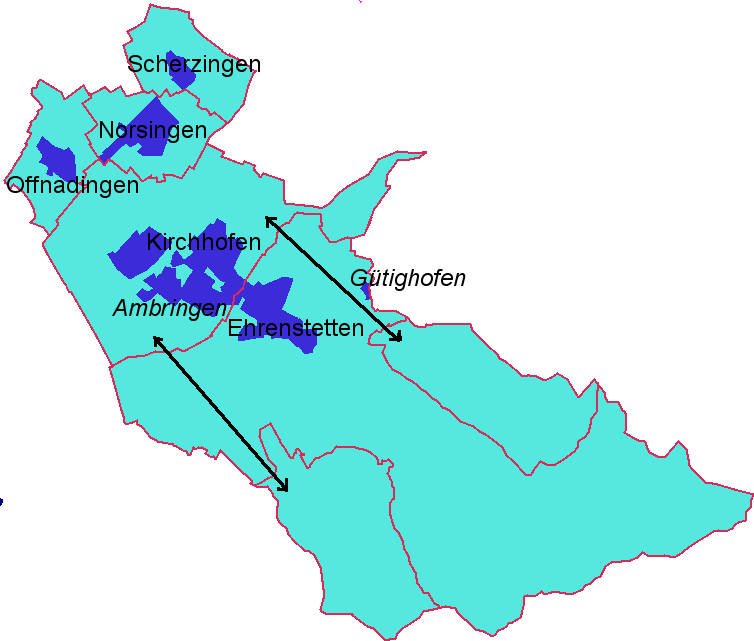
Map of Ehrenkirchen

The municipality (Gemeinde) of Ehrenkirchen is located in the Breisgau-Hochschwarzwald district of Baden-Württemberg, a state of the Federal Republic of Germany. It is 13 kilometers (8.1 mi) south of Freiburg im Breisgau, the capital of the region to which it is assigned. The municipal area is physically located in the Markgräflerland, along the Möhlin, a tributary of the Rhine. Elevation above sea level in the municipal area ranges from a high of 913 meters (2,995 ft) Normalnull (NN) at the top of the Stutzkopf to a low of 213 meters (699 ft) NN on the Möhlin.

The Federally-protected Ölberg Ehrenstetten nature reserve is located in Ehrenkirchen's municipal area.

== Politics ==
Ehrenkirchen has five boroughs (Ortsteile): Ehrenstetten, Kirchhofen, Norsingen, Offnadingen, and Scherzingen.

=== Coat of arms ===
The municipal coat of arms for Ehrenkirchen displays two images inspired by aspects of the municipality and its history, impaled upon the same blazon. The left image is of wine grapes, in yellow, above a yellow three-pointed hill upon a field of red. These images refer to the regional history of viticulture, particularly on the slopes of the Batzenberg, Kirchberg and Ölberg. The right image displays a blue stag, standing and facing to the left, upon a field of yellow. The stag is taken from the coat of arms of Saint Blaise Abbey, whose tincture was also used for Ehrenkirchen's, but spread around to abide by the rule of tincture. The coat of arms was approved for official use by Breisgau-Hochschwarzwald district office on 21 March 1977.

== Economy ==
The economy of Ehrenkirchen is based on tourism, viticulture, and an industrial sector that has been growing since the 1990s.

=== Transportation ===
Ehrenkirchen is connected to Germany's network of roadways by Bundesstraße 3 and to its railways by the Mannheim–Karlsruhe–Basel railway, which has a stop in Norsingen.
