= St. Ulrich's Priory in the Black Forest =

Coordinates: 47°54′29″N 7°50′15″E

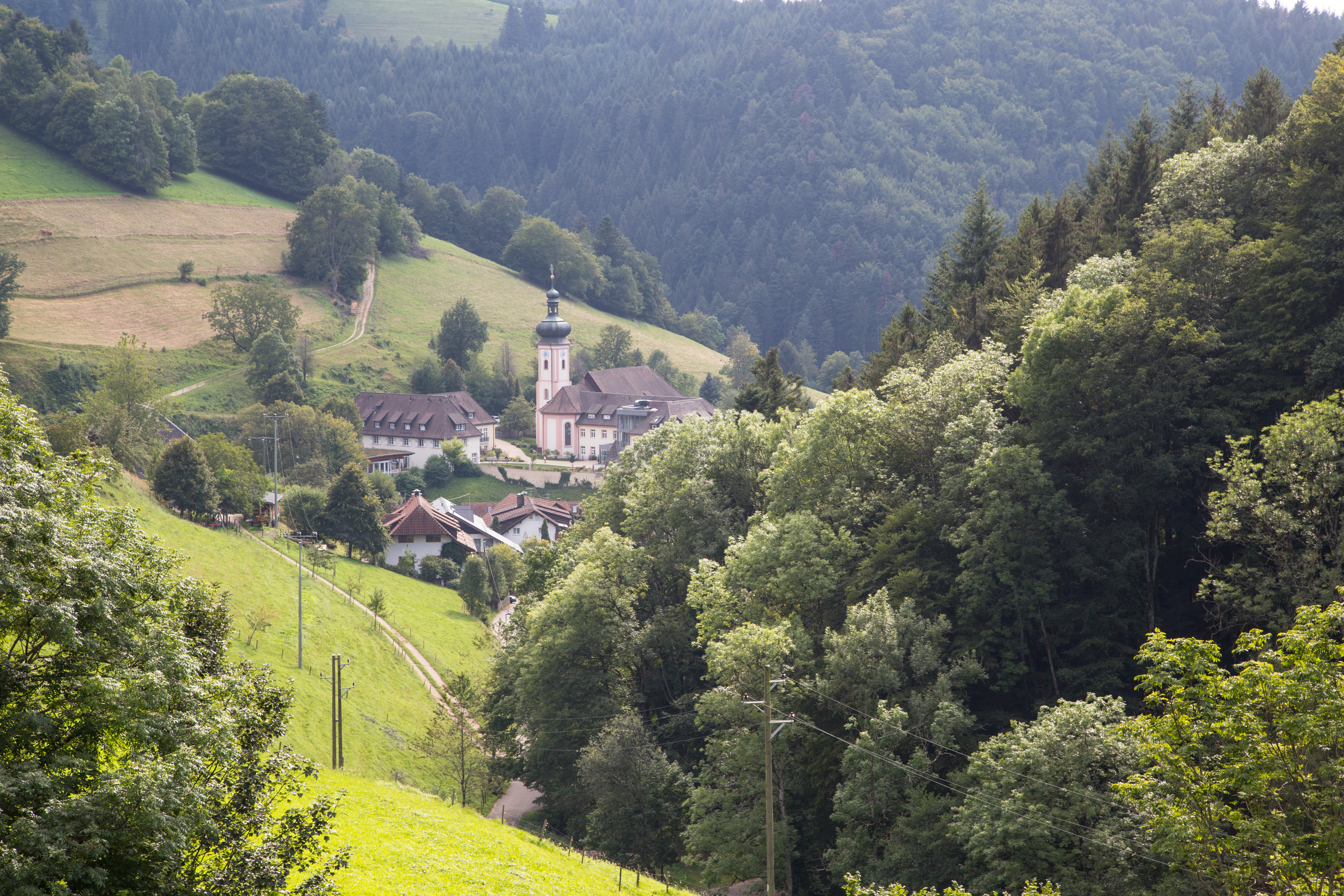
St. Ulrich Priory

St. Ulrich's Priory in the Black Forest (St. Ulrich im Schwarzwald) was a priory of Cluny Abbey (in Burgundy) founded in the valley of the River Möhlin in the Black Forest in about 1083. St. Ulrich is now part of the municipality of Bollschweil, in the district of Breisgau-Hochschwarzwald, Baden-Württemberg, Germany.

== History ==
The origins of the Cluniac priory of St. Ulrich lie in the time of the Investiture Controversy, when Ulrich of Zell (d. 1093), a monk of Regensburg and Cluny, founded a priory of the latter house on the western edge of the Black Forest. In the process, Ulrich took over an already existing monastic community, founded before 1072 on the Tuniberg (near Ober- and Unterrimsingen), which had moved between 1077 and 1080 to Grüningen near Oberrimsingen. Ulrich was considerably helped in this matter by the strong links with Cluny which had already been built up by the founder of the existing monastery, the nobleman Hesso of Eichstetten and Rimsingen, and by Hermann I, Margrave of Baden (d. 1074). At Ulrich's instigation, the community moved yet again in about 1087, this time to Zell in the Möhlin valley, where in 868 there had been a cell of the Abbey of St. Gall. Burkhard of Hasenburg (or of Fenis), Bishop of Basle from 1072 to 1107, obtained possession for the priory of the surrounding land, which was in need of clearance.

This, the only Cluniac house on the right bank of the Rhine, developed very satisfactorily. The priory's estates included possessions in the Breisgau, Alsace and in the Ortenau; it owned inter alia the rectories of Grüningen, Wolfenweiler, Bollschweil and Hochdorf, and in 1315 exchanged the contested rectory of Achkarren for that of Feuerbach. The Vögte (lords protectors) were: the Counts of Nimburg; the Bishops of Strasbourg (1200); the Hohenstaufen kings (1236); the Counts of Freiburg im Breisgau; and the Dukes of Further Austria (1445).

The priory and settlement were referred to both as "Zell" and as "St. Ulrich's" until the 14th century, when St. Ulrich's became the established name.

The monastic community declined in the 13th century. Repeated visitations from Cluny bear witness to a drastically reduced community, of four to seven monks and the prior. There was some revival under Prior Paulus von Kůnheim (1448–1489), but the community lost all independence during the Reformation. St. Ulrich's became in 1547 a priory of St. George's Abbey in the Black Forest, and then in 1560 of St. Peter's Abbey in the Black Forest, into which it was fully incorporated in 1578.

In 1806, during secularisation, it was dissolved at the same time as St. Peter's.

== Buildings ==
The Baroque church of St. Ulrich retains some traces of the preceding medieval buildings, in respect of which there are records of altar dedications, demolitions, repairs and new construction. There is a great font of the 11th or 12th century and a 13th-century Madonna.

== Priors of St. Ulrich's ==
- Saint Ulrich (Prior) (1080s-1093)
- Eberhard
- Adalbert (1120, 1147?)
- Gebhard (1145)
- Girard (1157)
- Rudolf (1171)
- Bertolf (1179, 1184)
- Heinrich (1264)
- Kuno (1274)
- Ulrich (1283, 1291)
- Gerhart (1302, 1304)
- Nikolaus (1315)
- Johannes (1316, 1325)
- Wilhelm (1335)
- Heinrich (1345)
- Johannes Peyer (1365, 1376)
- Wilhelm von Matin (1383, 1392?)
- Heinrich (1390, 1398)
- Heinrich (1400)
- Stephan (1405)
- Philipp Chalome (1409)
- Johann von Breitingen (1434, 1444)
- Paulus von Kůnheim (1448–1489)
- Jodocus Erny (1492)
- N. Distaing (1497–1502)
- Aymo de Suturno (1508, 1511)
- Rudolf Ecklin (1514–1541)
- Johannes Chenrodi (1542, 1544)
- Stephan Baudin (1544–1546)
- Nikolaus Wiclin (1547)

== Burials ==
- Ulrich of Zell
