= Bollschweil =

- Municipality
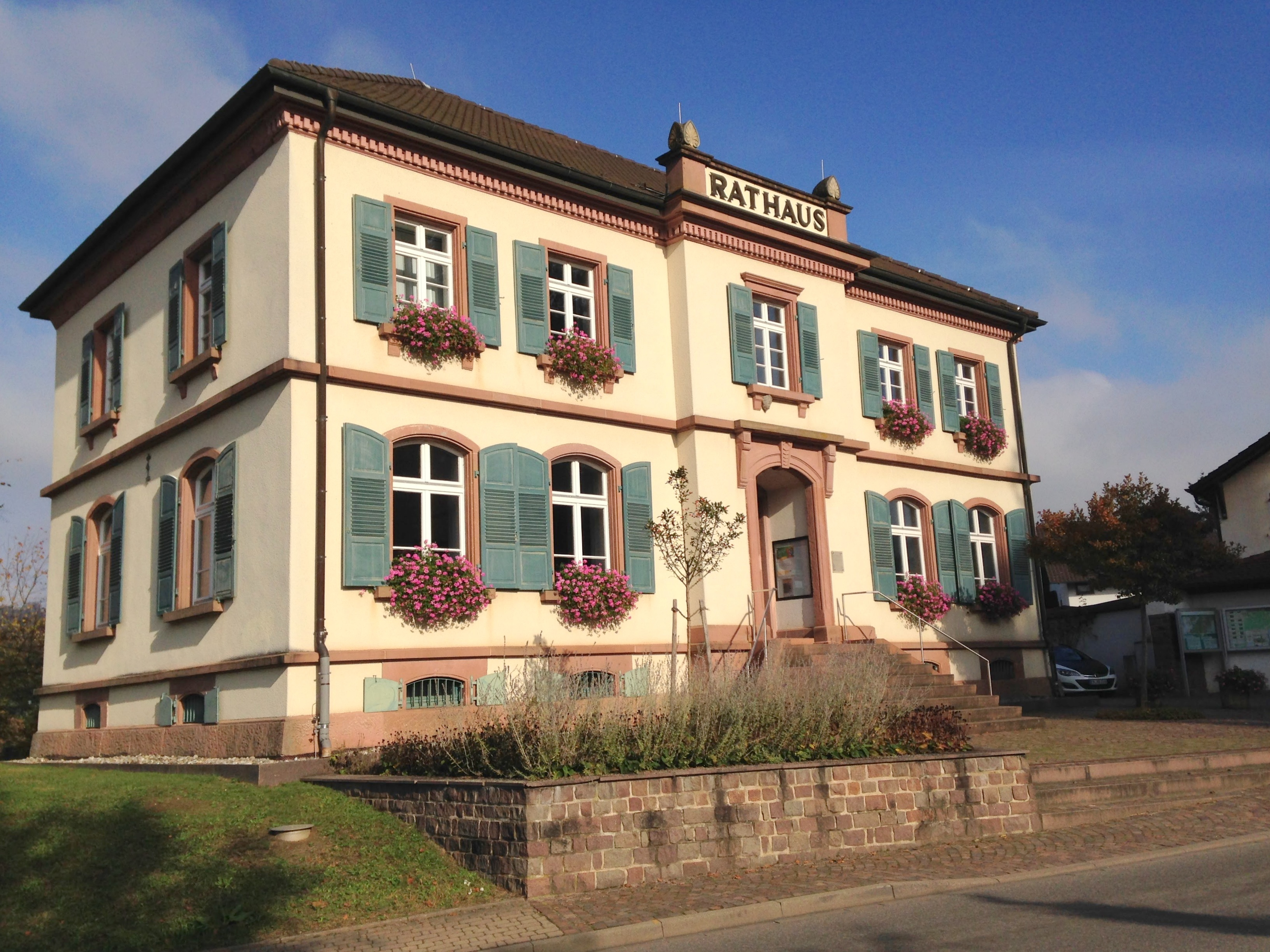
- The town hall of Bollschweil

- Coat of arms

- Location of Bollschweil within Breisgau-Hochschwarzwald district
- Interactive map of Bollschweil
- Location within Germany Location within Baden-Württemberg
- Coordinates: 47°55′14″N 07°47′21″E
- Country: Germany
- State: Baden-Württemberg
- Admin. region: Freiburg
- District: Breisgau-Hochschwarzwald

Government
  - Mayor (2022–30): Jörg Wagner

Area
  - Total: 16.42 km^{2} (6.34 sq mi)
- Elevation: 328 m (1,076 ft)

Population (2025-12-31)
  - Total: 2,351
  - Density: 143.2/km^{2} (370.8/sq mi)
- Time zone: UTC+01:00 (CET)
  - Summer (DST): UTC+02:00 (CEST)
- Postal codes: 79283
- Dialling codes: 07633
- Vehicle registration: FR
- Website: www.bollschweil.de

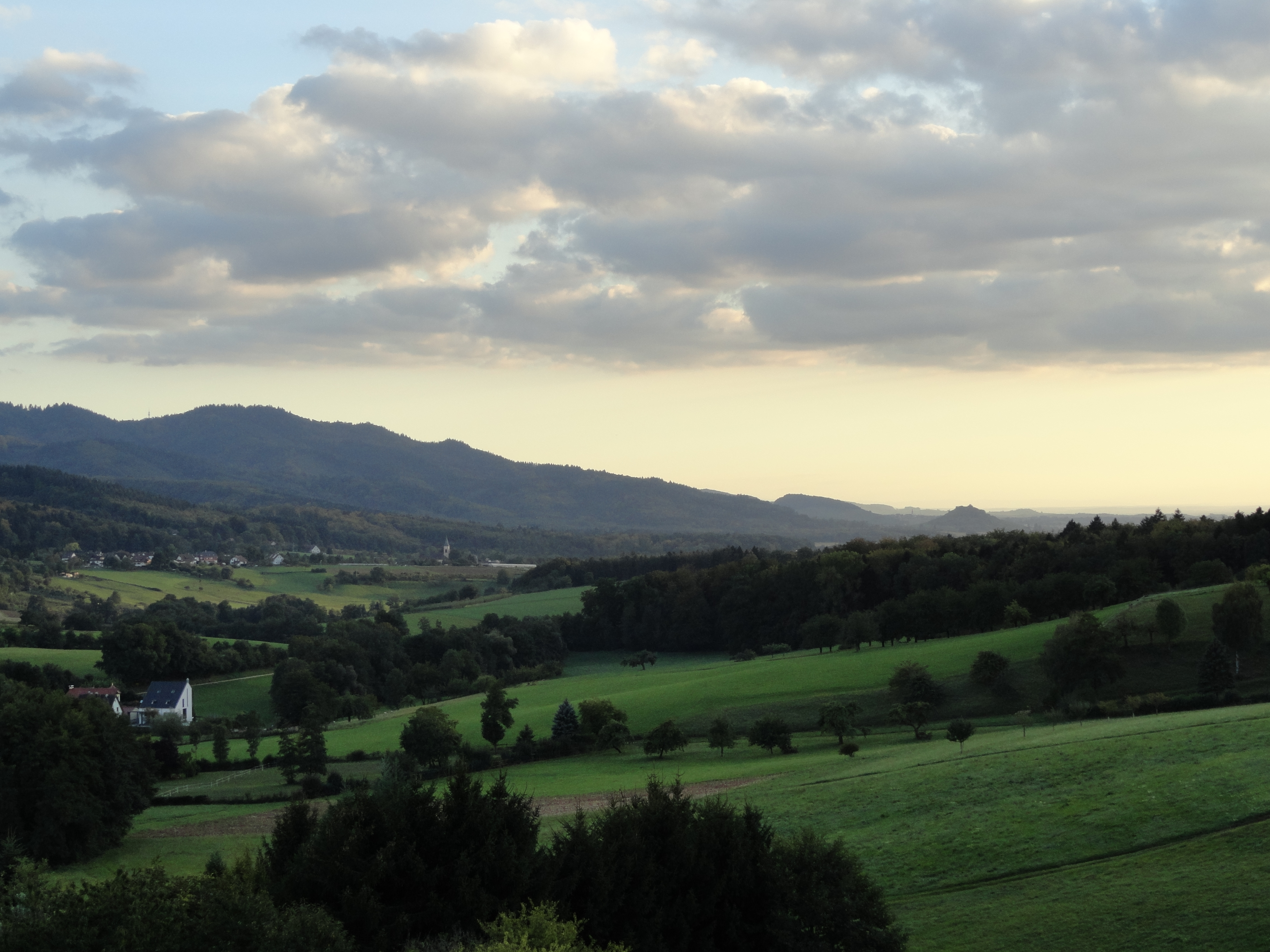
View from Schönberg into the Hexental with the Church of Bollschweiler

Bollschweil is a municipality in the Breisgau-Hochschwarzwald district, Baden-Württemberg, Germany, located approximately 10 km south of Freiburg.

== History ==
The earliest surviving written record of the settlement appears in the records of the monastery at St Gallen, dated 838. At this time Bollschweil was named Puabilinisvilare. The town's subsequent history is closely entwined with that of the aristocratic Snewlin-Bernlapp family, a branch of the Snewlin family which was extremely influential throughout the Breisgau region. When, in 1837, the Snewlin-Bernlapps died out, the castle and settlement came into the hands of the von Holzing-Berstett family, whose descendants still inhabit the castle.

Between 1087 and his death in 1093, Ulrich of Zell established here the Priory convent of St Ulrich in the Black Forest, but this was relocated to Sölden in 1115.
