= First Schafalpenkopf =

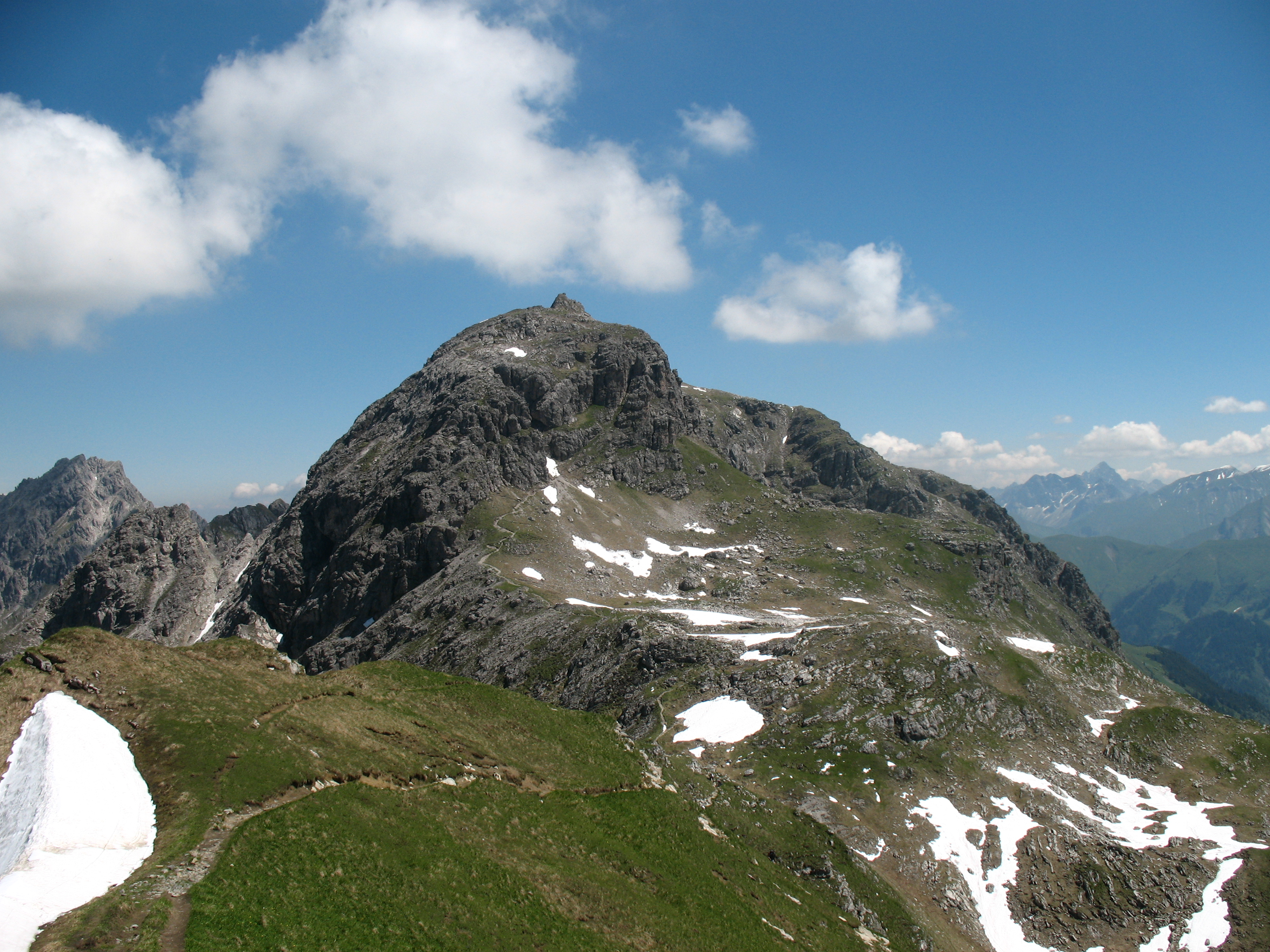
- From the southwest

Highest point
- Elevation: 2,272 m (7,454 ft)
- Prominence: 102 m ↓ Notch to the Second Schafalpenkopf
- Isolation: 0.5 km → Second Schafalpenkopf
- Coordinates: 47°18′10″N 10°12′19″E

Geography
- Location within Alps
- Location: Border of Bavaria, Germany / and Vorarlberg, Austria
- Parent range: Southeastern Walsertal Mountains, Allgäu Alps

Geology
- Rock type: main dolomite

Climbing
- Normal route: Mindelheim Klettersteig

The First Schafalpenkopf (German: Erste Schafalpenkopf) or Southwestern Schafalpenkopf (Südwestlicher Schafalpenkopf) is a 2,272-metre-high mountain in the Allgäu Alps. It is part of the Schafalpenköpfe and the Mindelheim Klettersteig.

== Location and surrounding area ==
The border between Germany and Austria runs over the summit of the First Schafalpenkopf, simultaneously dividing the states of Bavaria and Vorarlberg. On the Bavarian side it belongs to the administrative areas of the county of Oberallgäu and the market town of Oberstdorf, on Austria soil to the district of Bregenz and the parish of Mittelberg.

To the northeast the Second Schafalpenkopf (2,302 m) follows the First, the two being separated by a 2,170-metre-high arête. It is the reference point for the First Schafalpenkopf's topographic prominence of 102 metres. Its isolation is 500 metres, reaching to the Second Schafalpenkopf. To the south of the First Schafalpenkopf is the valley of Rappenalptal. To the southwest the First Schafalpenkopf transitions across to the Kemptner Kopf (2,191 m). To the north of the mountain is the valley of Wildental, which leads into the Kleinwalsertal.

== Geology ==
The First Schafalpenkopf is composed of main dolomite.

== Origin of the name ==
For the origin of the name Schafalpenköpfe see Schafalpenköpfe.

== Alpinism ==
=== Bases ===
Bases for tours of the First Schafalpenkopf are the Fiderepass Hut and the Mindelheim Hut (2,013 m). In addition it is also possible to climb it from Mittelberg through the Wildental valley and from the top station of the Kanzelwandbahn.

=== Routes ===
The normal route for the First Schafalpenkopf is the Mindelheim Klettersteig. This medium-difficulty klettersteig (C) crosses the mountain from northeast to southwest, from the Second Schafalpenkopf. Climbers are assisted by cables, iron rungs and a ladder.

The routes from the time before the construction of the klettersteig are hardly used today. The old normal route had a climbing grade of UIAA II and ran through the Wildental valley to the top.

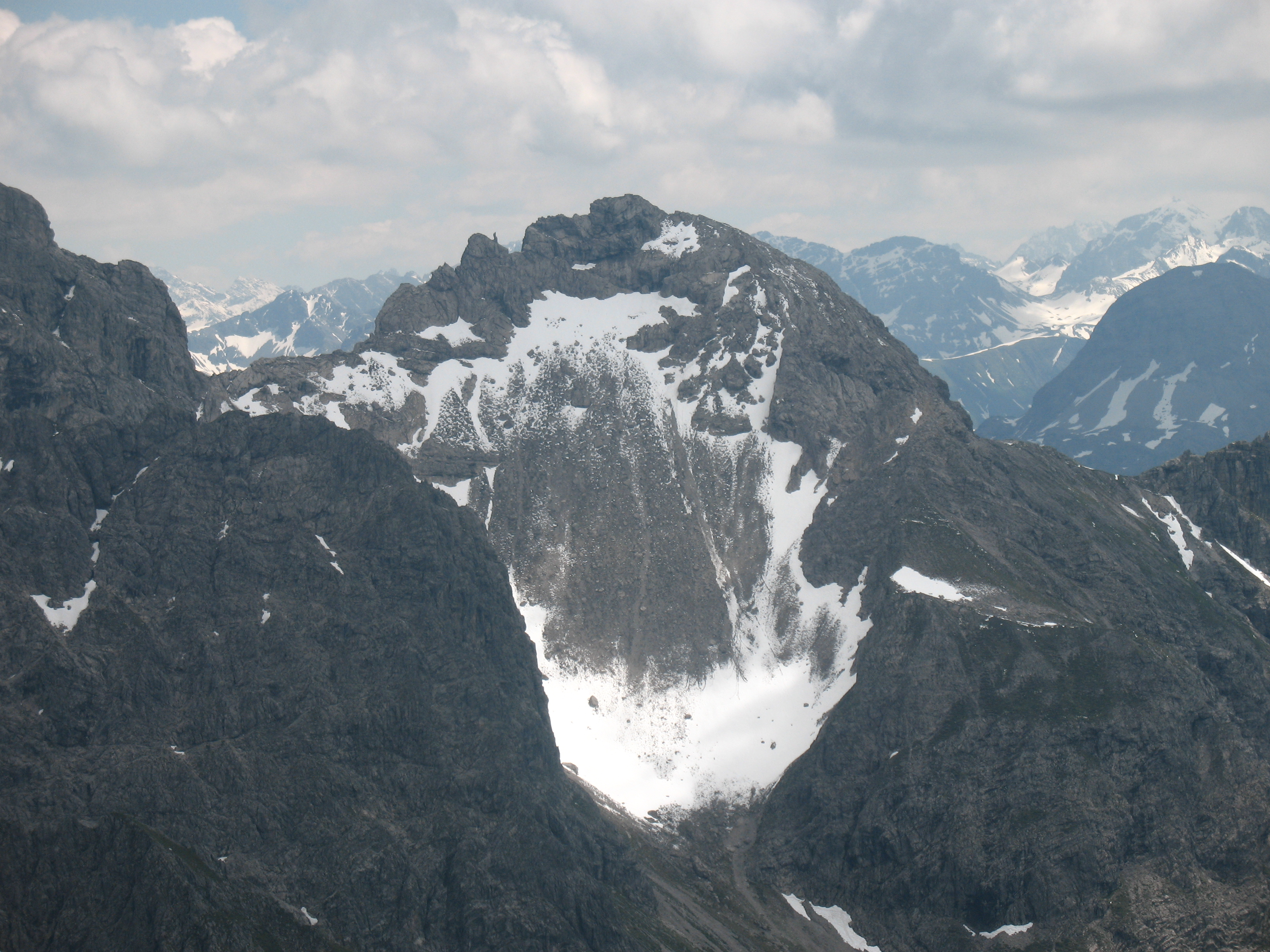
From the Walser Hammerspitze

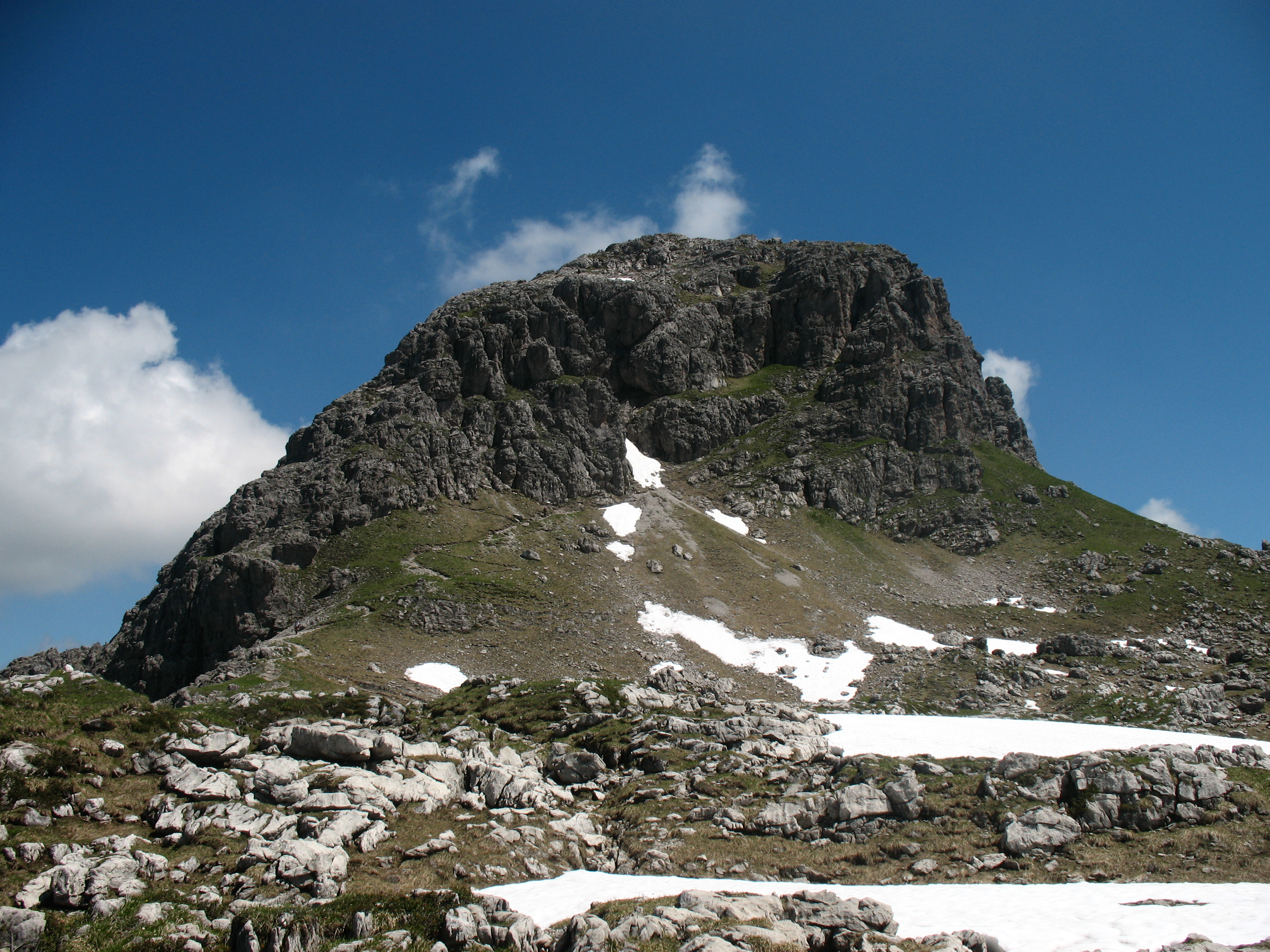
Summit block

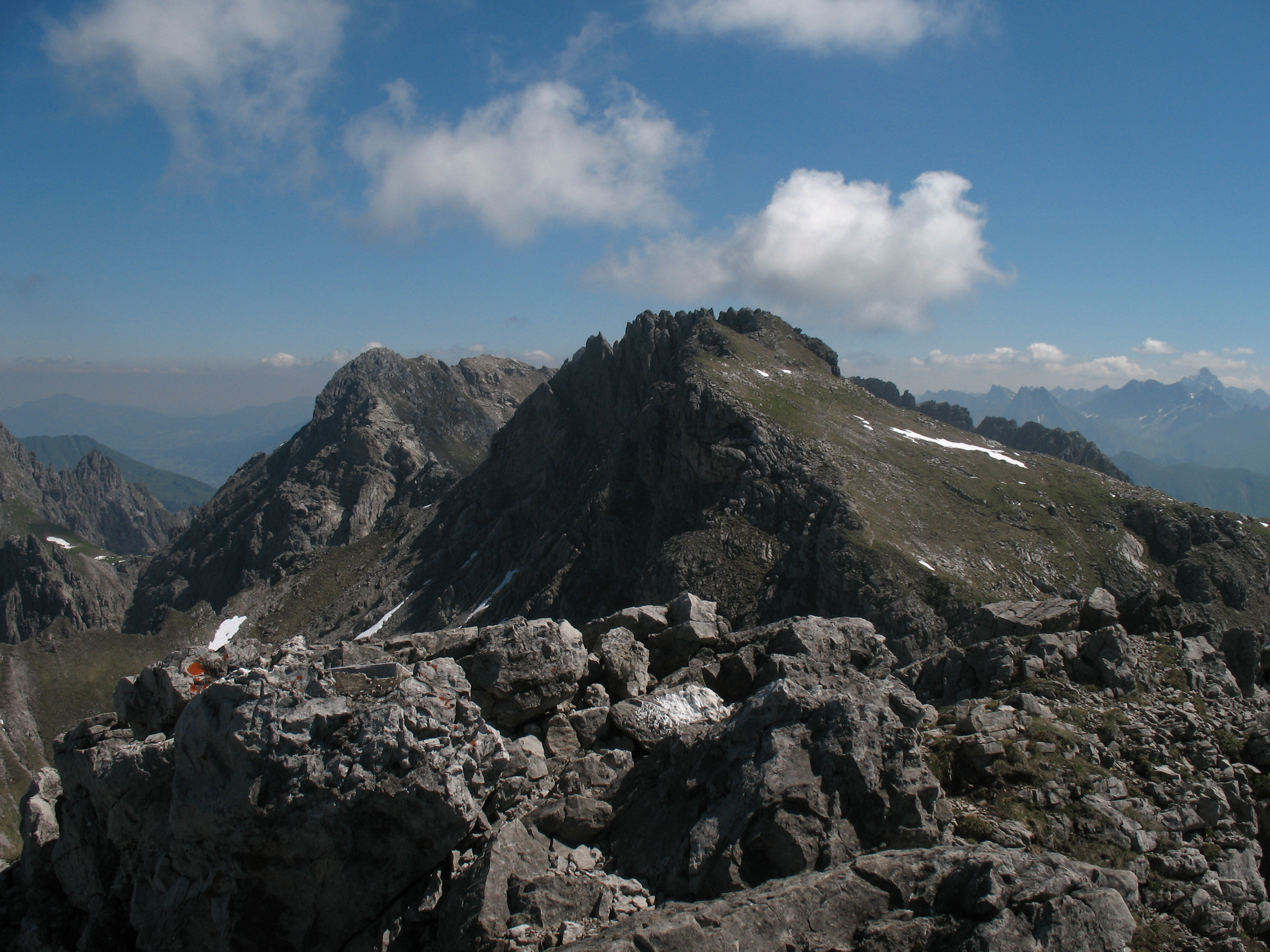
Summit region

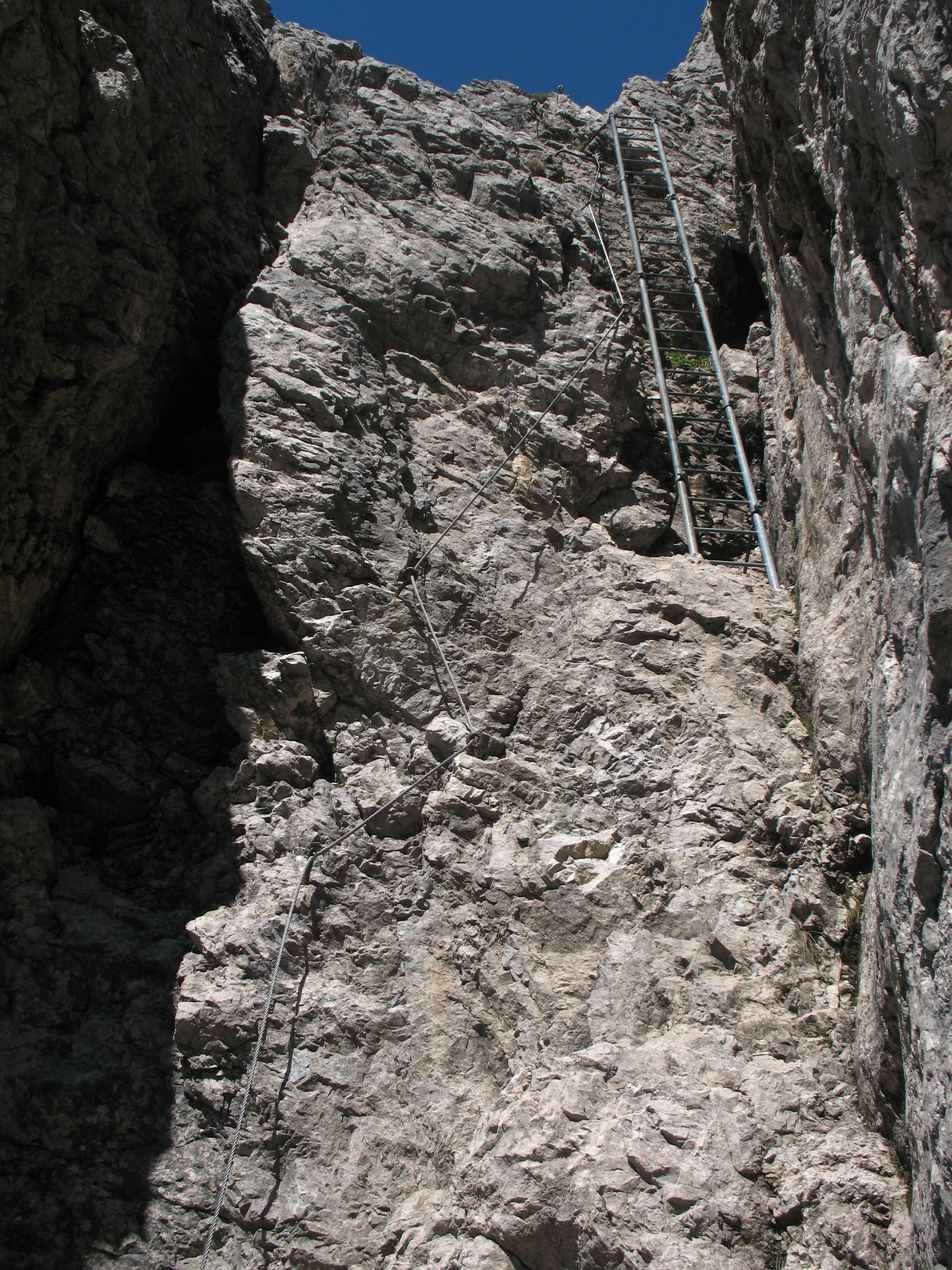
Klettersteig passage
