= Second Schafalpenkopf =

Zweiter Schafalpenkopf
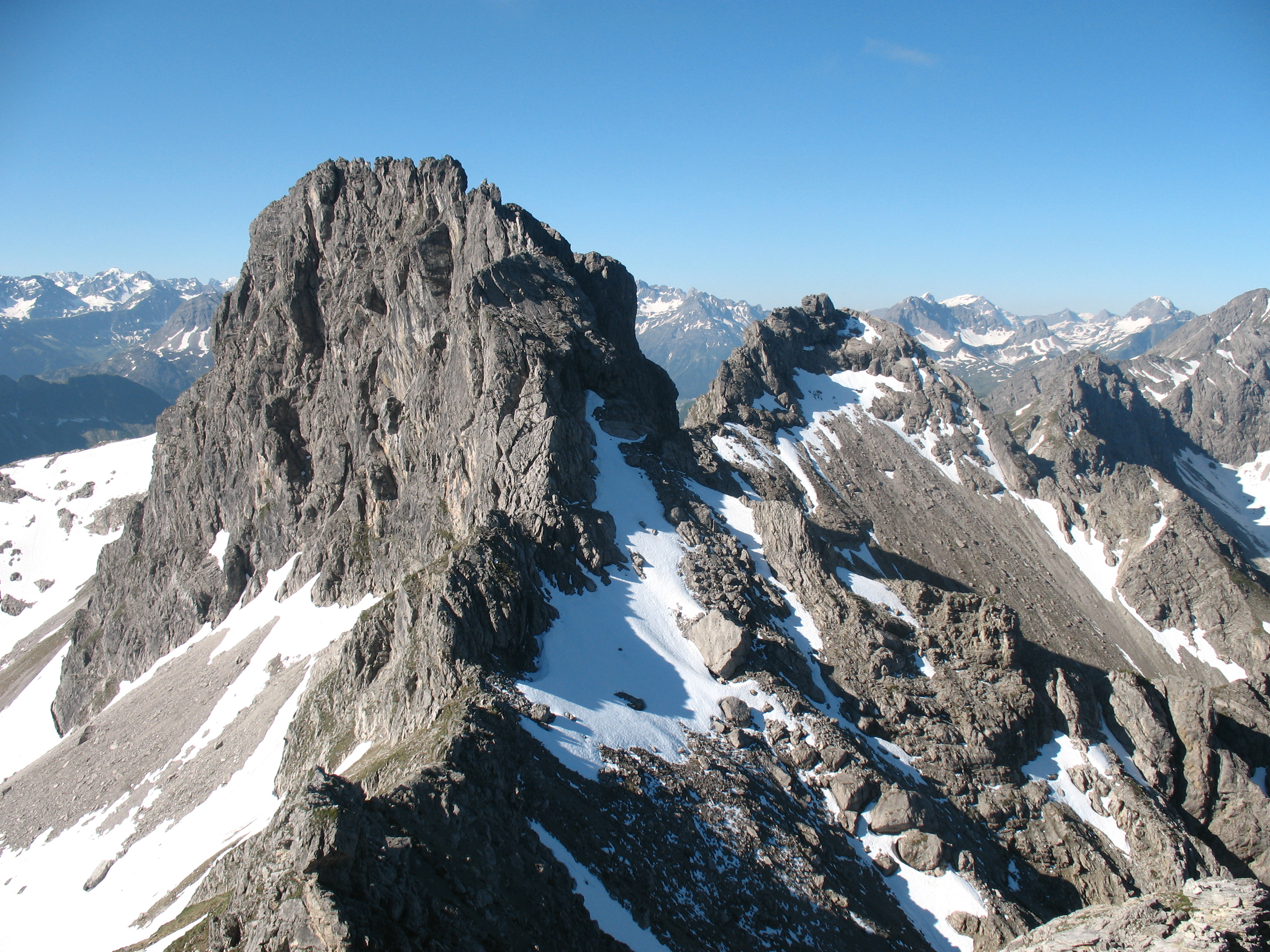
- Second and First Schafalpenkopf

Highest point
- Elevation: 2,302 m above sea level (NHN) (7,552 ft)
- Prominence: 122 m ↓ Notch to the Third Schafalpenkopf
- Isolation: 0.6 km → Third Schafalpenkopf
- Coordinates: 47°18′23″N 10°12′37″E

Geography
- Location within Alps
- Location: Bavaria, Germany / Vorarlberg, Austria
- Parent range: Southeastern Walsertal Mountains, Allgäu Alps

Geology
- Rock type: main dolomite

Climbing
- Normal route: Mindelheim Klettersteig

The Second Schafalpenkopf (German: Zweite Schafalpenkopf), also Middle Schafalpenkopf (Mittlerer Schafalpenkopf) is a 2,302-metre-high mountain in the Allgäu Alps. It is part of the Schafalpenköpfe and the Mindelheim Klettersteig.

== Location and surrounding area ==
The border between Germany and Austria runs over the summit of the Second Schafalpenkopf, simultaneously separating the federal states of Bavaria and Vorarlberg. On the Bavarian side it belongs to the administrative units of the county of Oberallgäu and market town of Oberstdorf, on Austrian soil to the district of Bregenz and the parish of Mittelberg.

To the northeast the Second Schafalpenkopf is followed by the Third Schafalpenkopf (2,320 m) from which it is separated by a 2,180-metre-high arête, which is the reference point for the Second Schafalpenkopf's topographic prominence of 122 metres. Its isolation is 600 metres, extending across to the Third Schafalpenkopf. To the south of the Second Schafalpenkopf is the valley of Rappenalptal. In the southwest the mountain transitions to the First Schafalpenkopf (2,272 m). In the northwest of the mountain is the valley of Wildental which leads to the Kleinwalsertal führt.

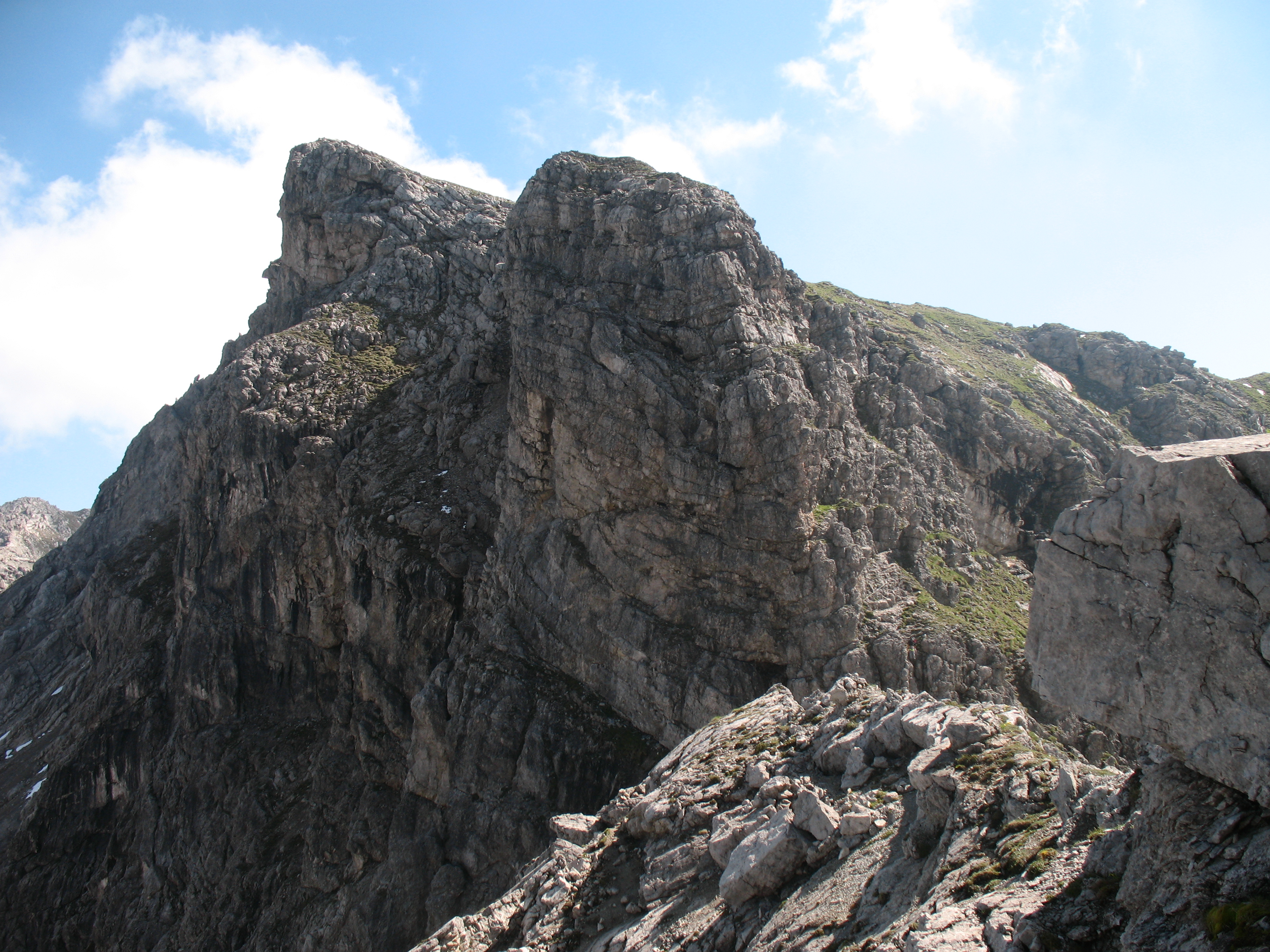
From the crossing to the First Schafalpenkopf

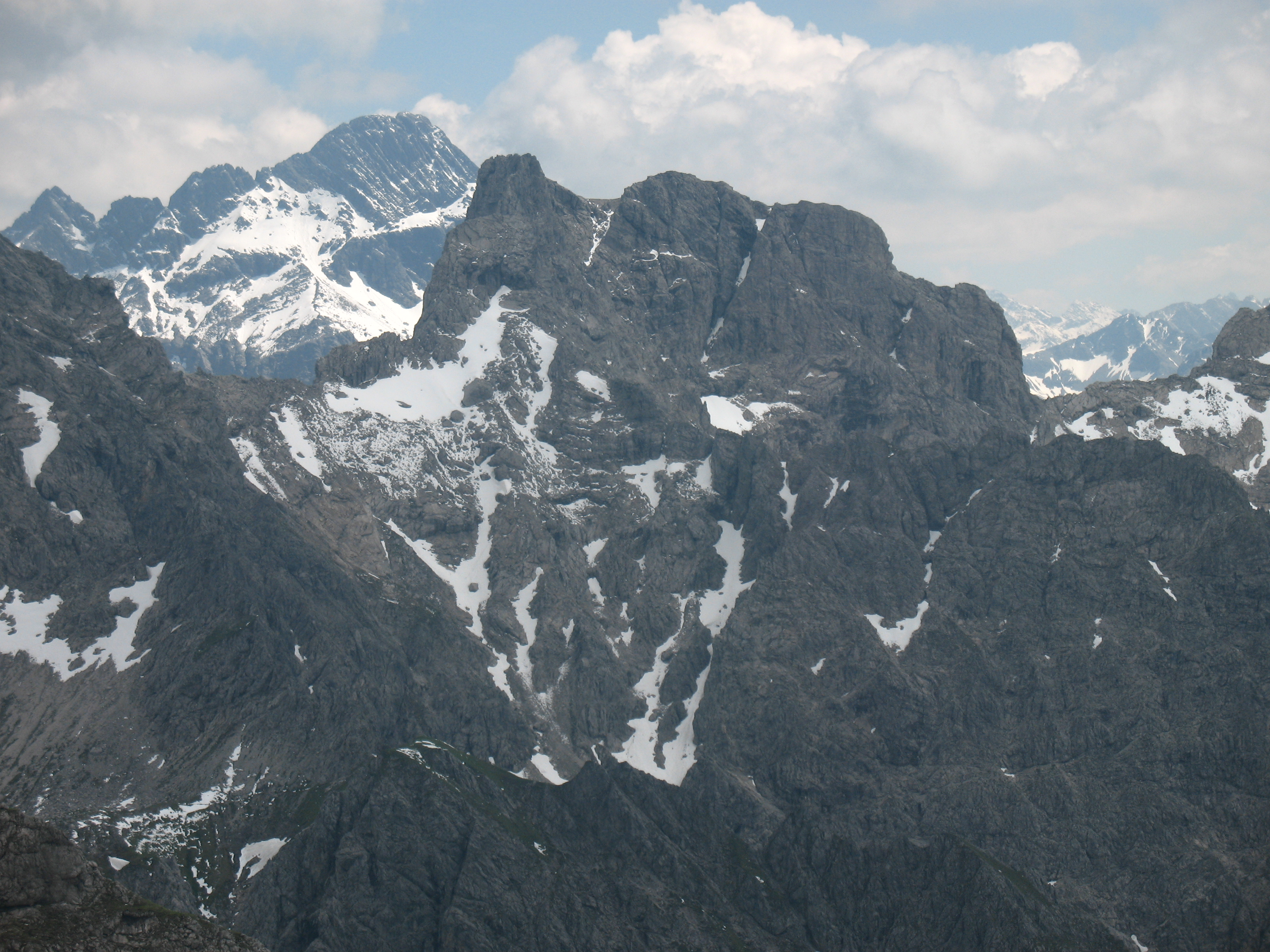
From the Walser Hammerspitze

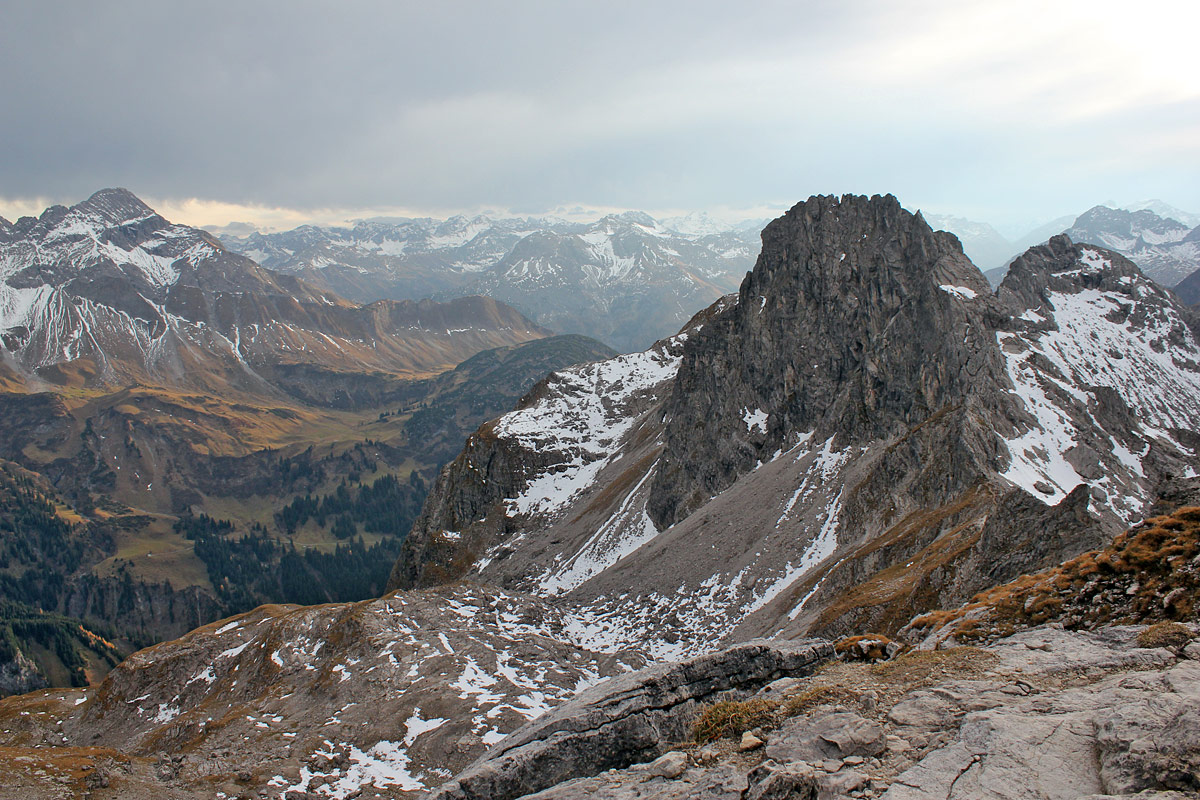
From the Third Schafalpenkopf

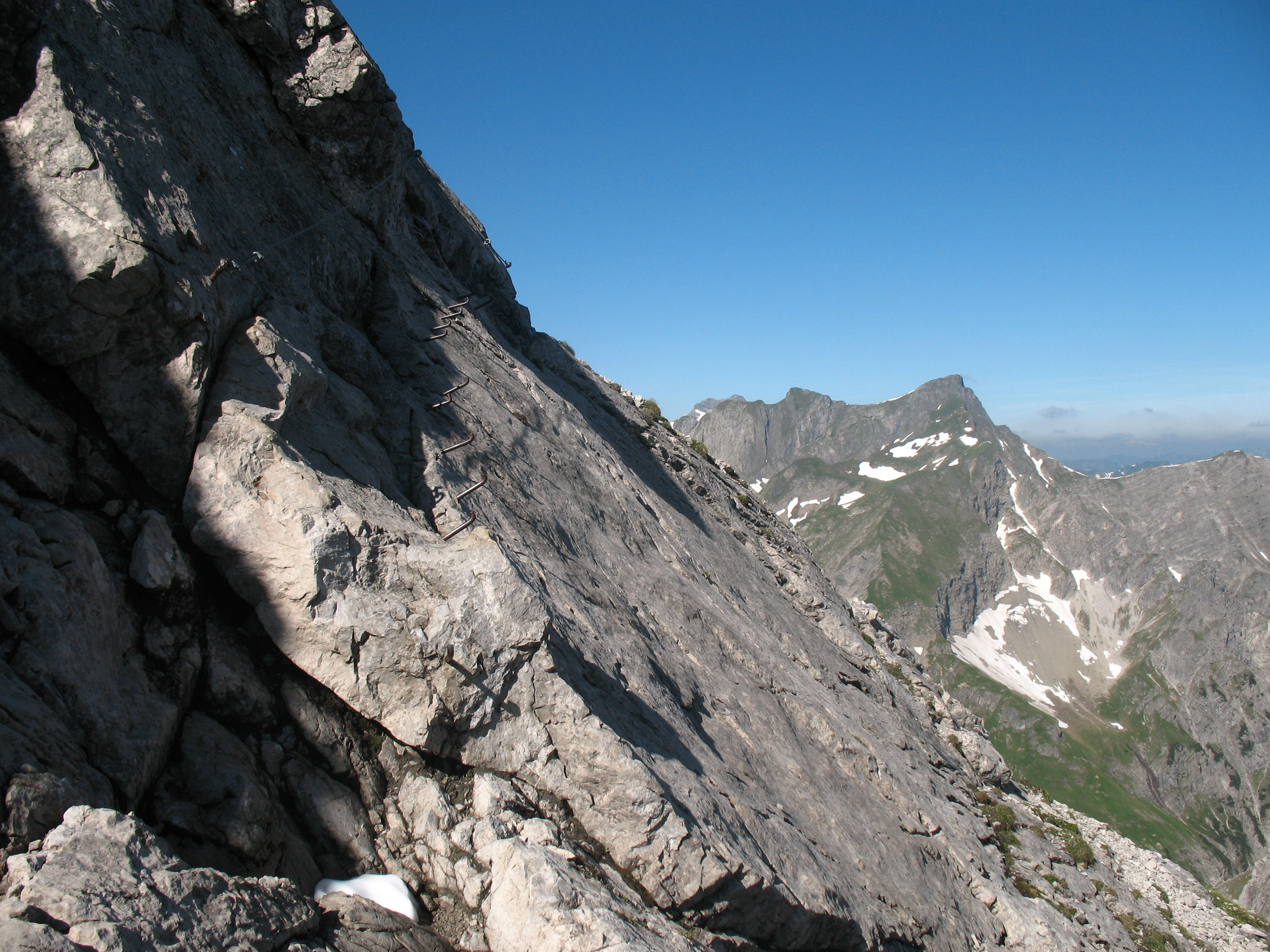
Klettersteig passage

== See also ==
- Allgäu Alps
- Kleinwalsertal
