= Schafalpenköpfe =

Mountain formation in Germany and Austria

Coordinates: 47°18′10″N 10°12′19″E

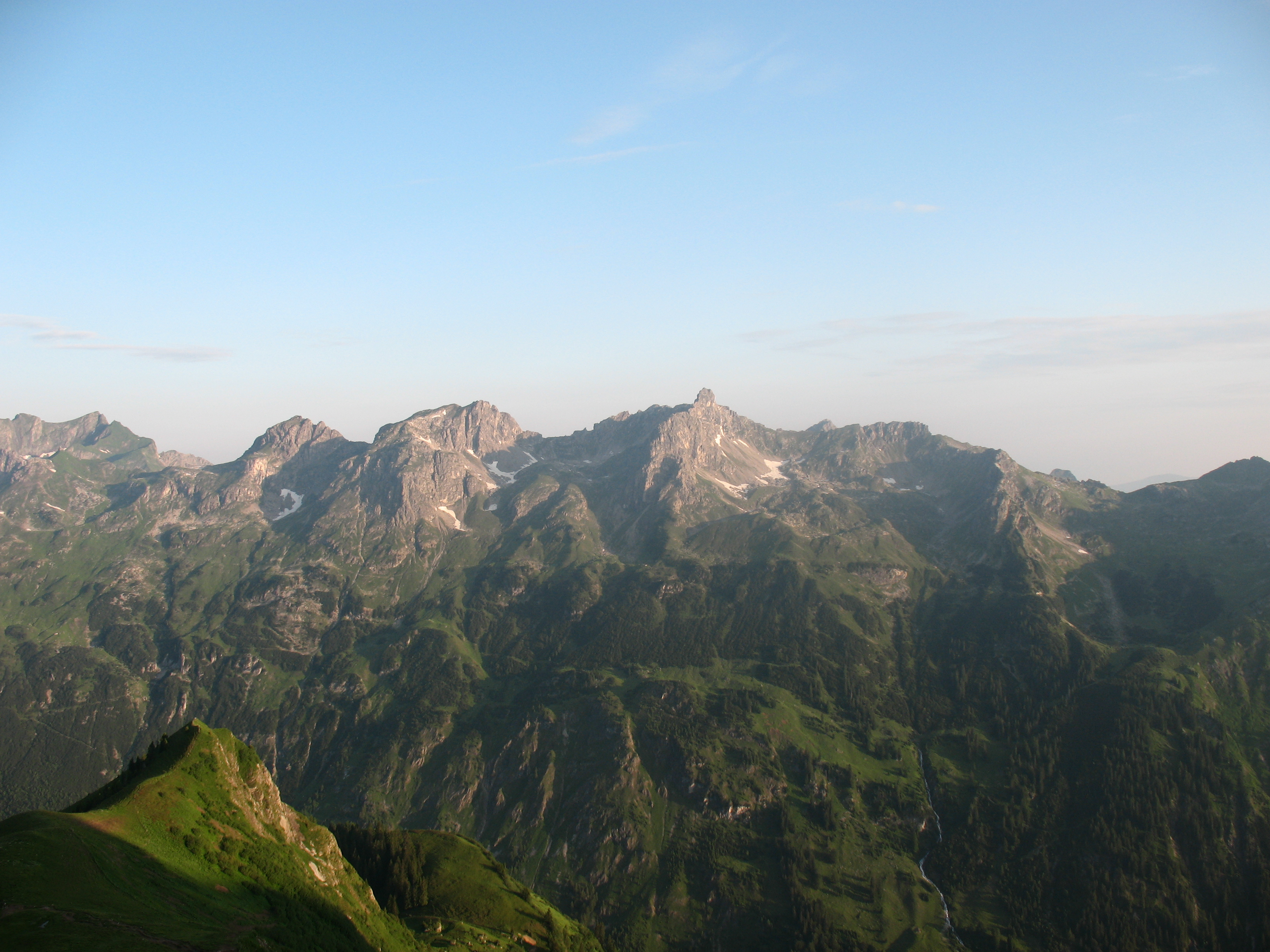
Southeast side, seen from the Rappensee Hut

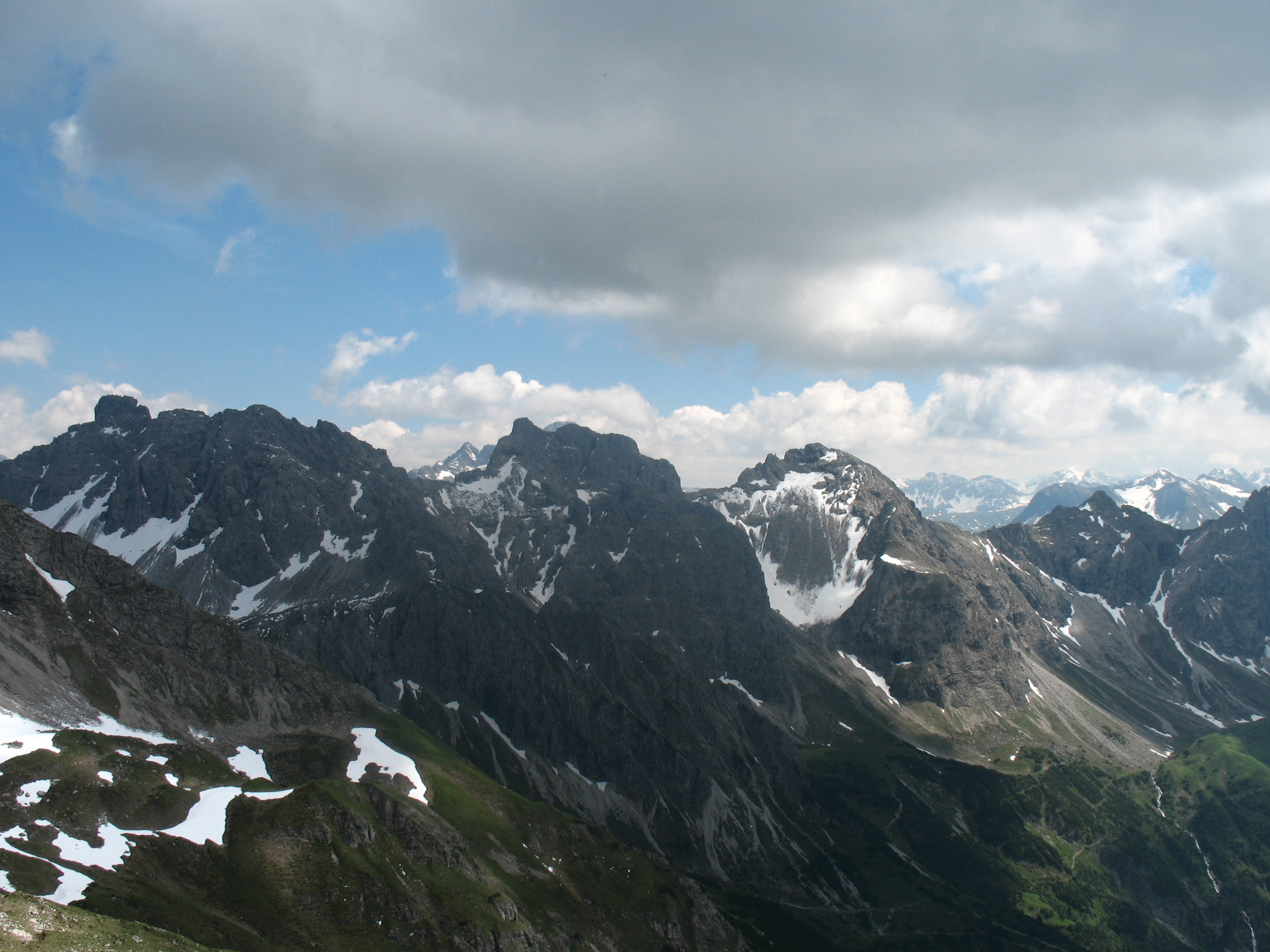
Northwest side, seen from the Walser Hammerspitze

The Schafalpenköpfe are a small mountain formation, consisting of three peaks, the First (2,272 m), Second (2,302 m) and Third Schafalpenkopf (2,320 m). A 2.4-kilometre-long klettersteig of medium difficulty (grade C), the Mindelheimer Klettersteig, runs over them.

== Origin of the name ==
The naming of the mountains as Die Wilden, "the Wild Ones" probably comes from the valley of Kleinwalsertal to the north, because they do not appear to be of agricultural value from that side. They were first mentioned in 1783 as the Wilden Köpf in Blasius Hueber's Vorarlberg map.

The name of "Schafalpenköpfe" comes from the south and refers to the rocky summits (Felsköpfe) above the alpine sheep pastures (Schäfalpen) of the Taufersbergalpe, an alpine meadow. The name first appears as Schäfalpenkopf and Schäfalpenköpfl in 1819 in an old survey sheet of the Bavarian State Office for Survey and Geoinformation in Munich. An 1844 description of the border includes the words: über den ersten Schafalpenkopf, über den zweiten Schafalpenkopf, bis zu dem dritten Schafalpenkopf ("over the first Schafalpenkopf, over the second Schafalpenkopf to the third Schafalpenkopf").

In an Austria special map for the Biberkopf region they are also named as the Walser Kerle.
