= Griesgundkopf =

Coordinates: 47°19′24″N 10°14′19″E

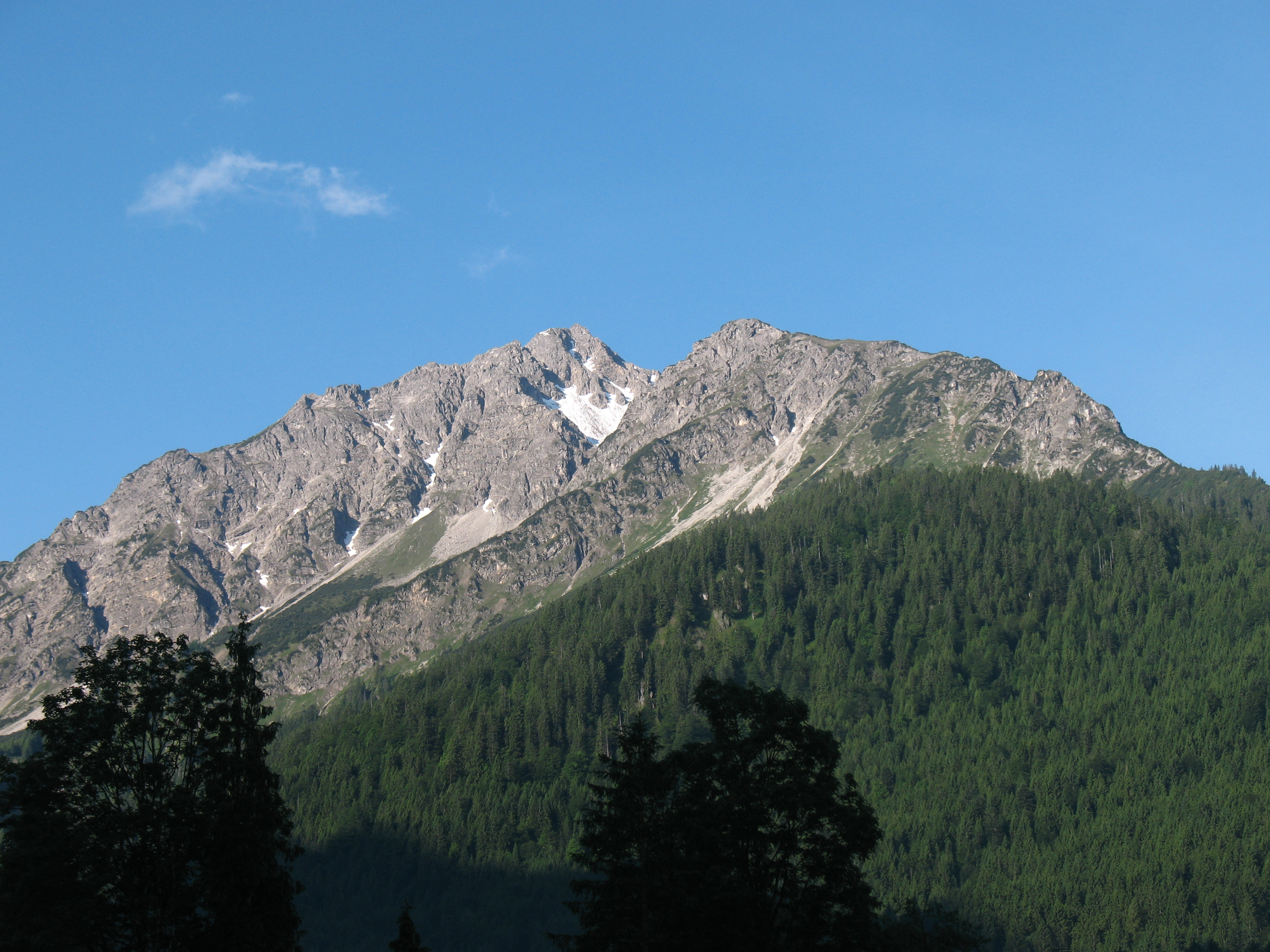

Highest point
- Elevation: 2,164 m (7,100 ft)
- Prominence: 10 m (33 ft)
- Parent peak: nameless subpeak P. 2165 of Alpgundkopf (line parent)
- Isolation: 0.09 km (0.056 mi) to P.2165

Geography
- Location: Bavaria, Germany

Griesgundkopf is a minor elevation at the northeastern mountain shoulder of Alpgundkopf in the Allgäu Alps in Bavaria, Germany.
