= Alpgundkopf =

Mountain in Bavaria, Germany

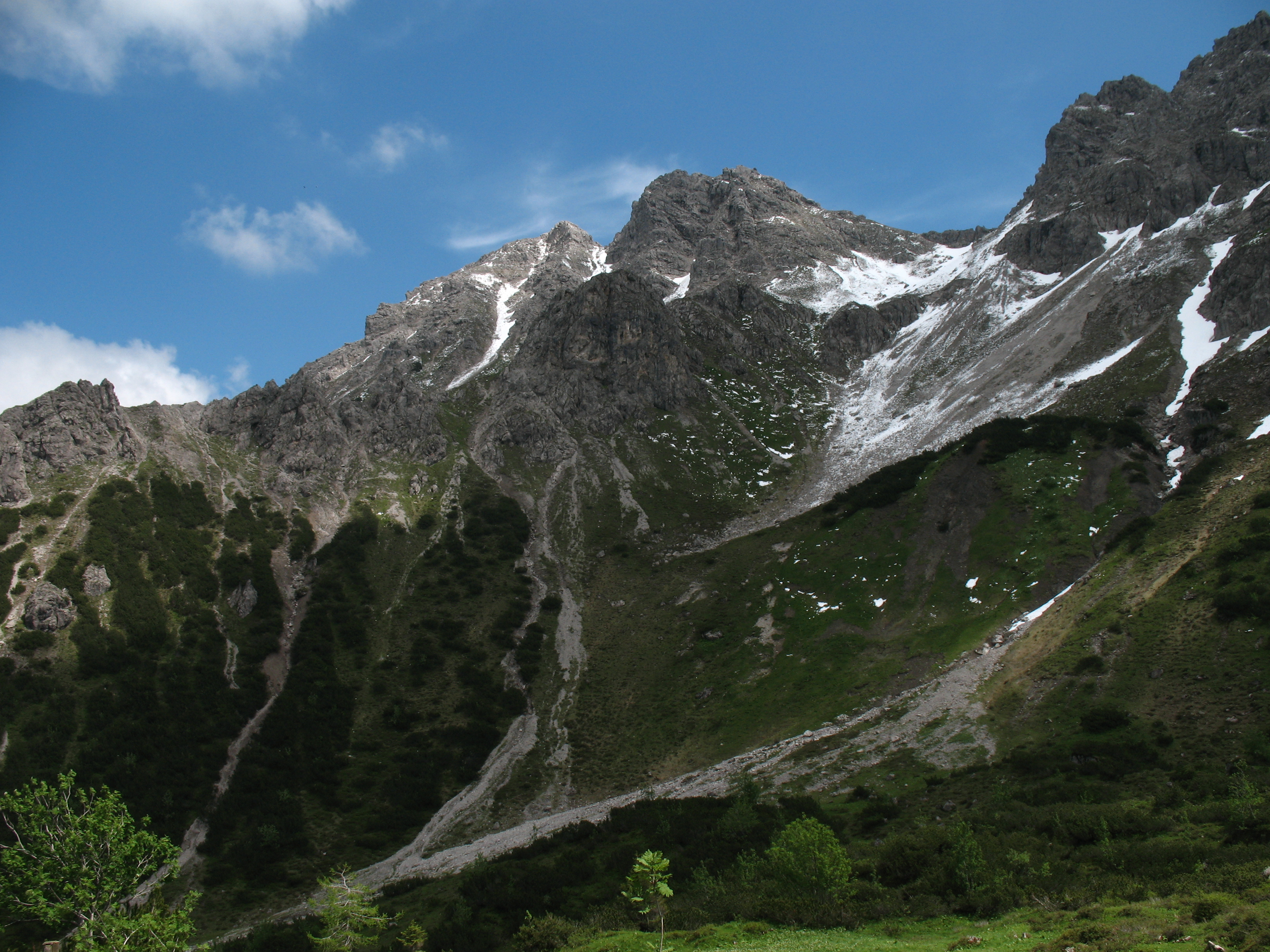
- The Alpgundkopf from the Warmatsgundbach valley

Highest point
- Elevation: 2,176 m above sea level (7,142 ft)
- Prominence: 170 m ↓ Roßgundscharte
- Isolation: 1.4 km → Saubuckelkopf
- Coordinates: 47°19′19″N 10°14′14″E

Geography
- Location within Bavaria
- Location: Bavaria, Germany
- Parent range: Southeastern Walsertal Mountains, Allgäu Alps

Climbing
- First ascent: by locals

The Alpgundkopf is a mountain, 2,176 m high, in the Allgäu Alps. It lies in the Schafalpenköpfe group, northeast of the Roßgundkopf, from which it is separated by the Alpgundscharte col. To the southeast, 383 metres away, lies the lower shoulder Alpkopf and, 1,035 metres away, the small lake of Guggersee.

== Ascent ==
There are no waymarked paths up the Alpgundkopf. The normal approach is a trackless route from the notch of Alpgundscharte that requires sure-footedness and mountain experience. All other ascents are not recommended due to the brittle nature of the rock.

== Photographs ==
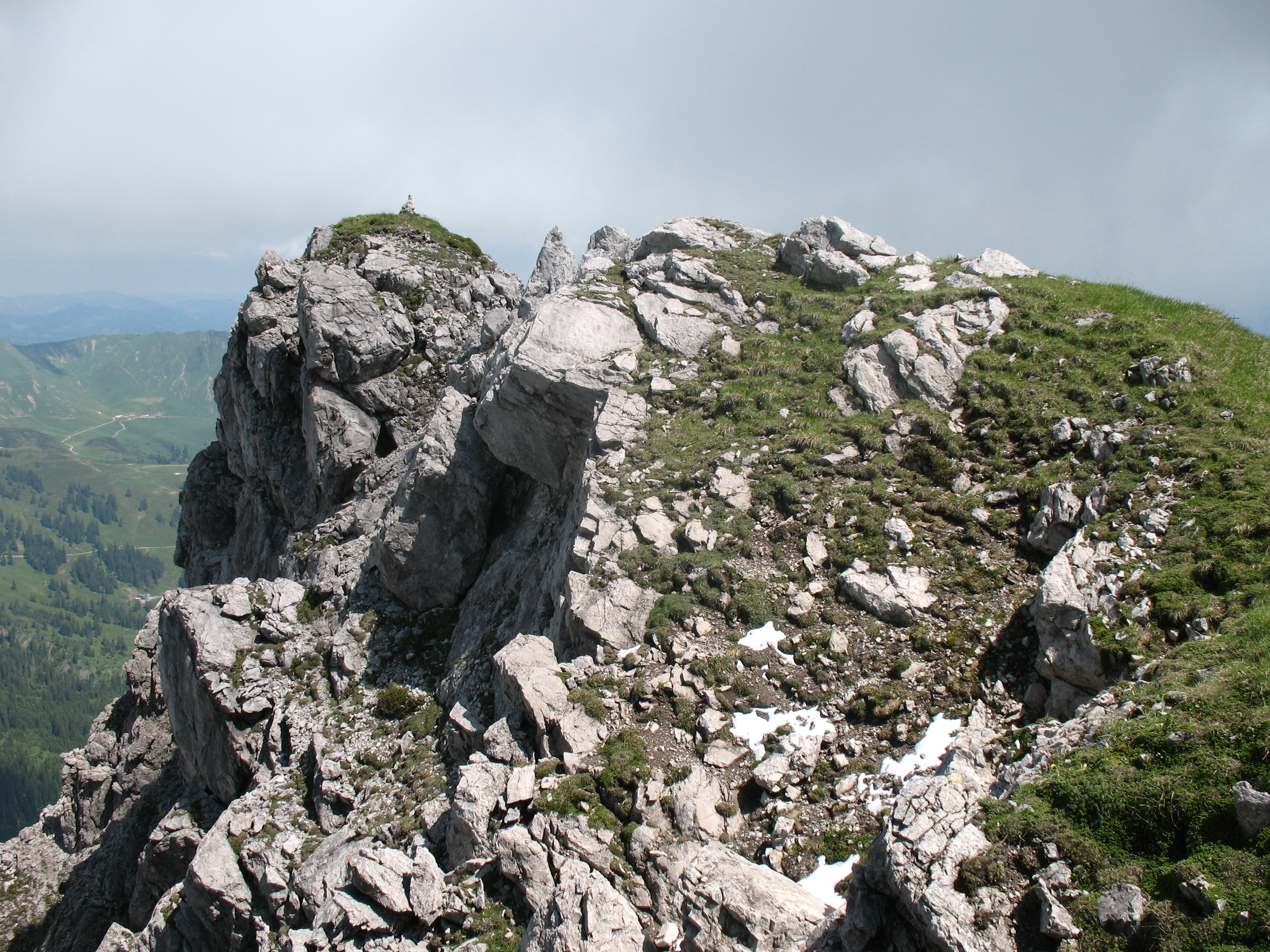
Summit block

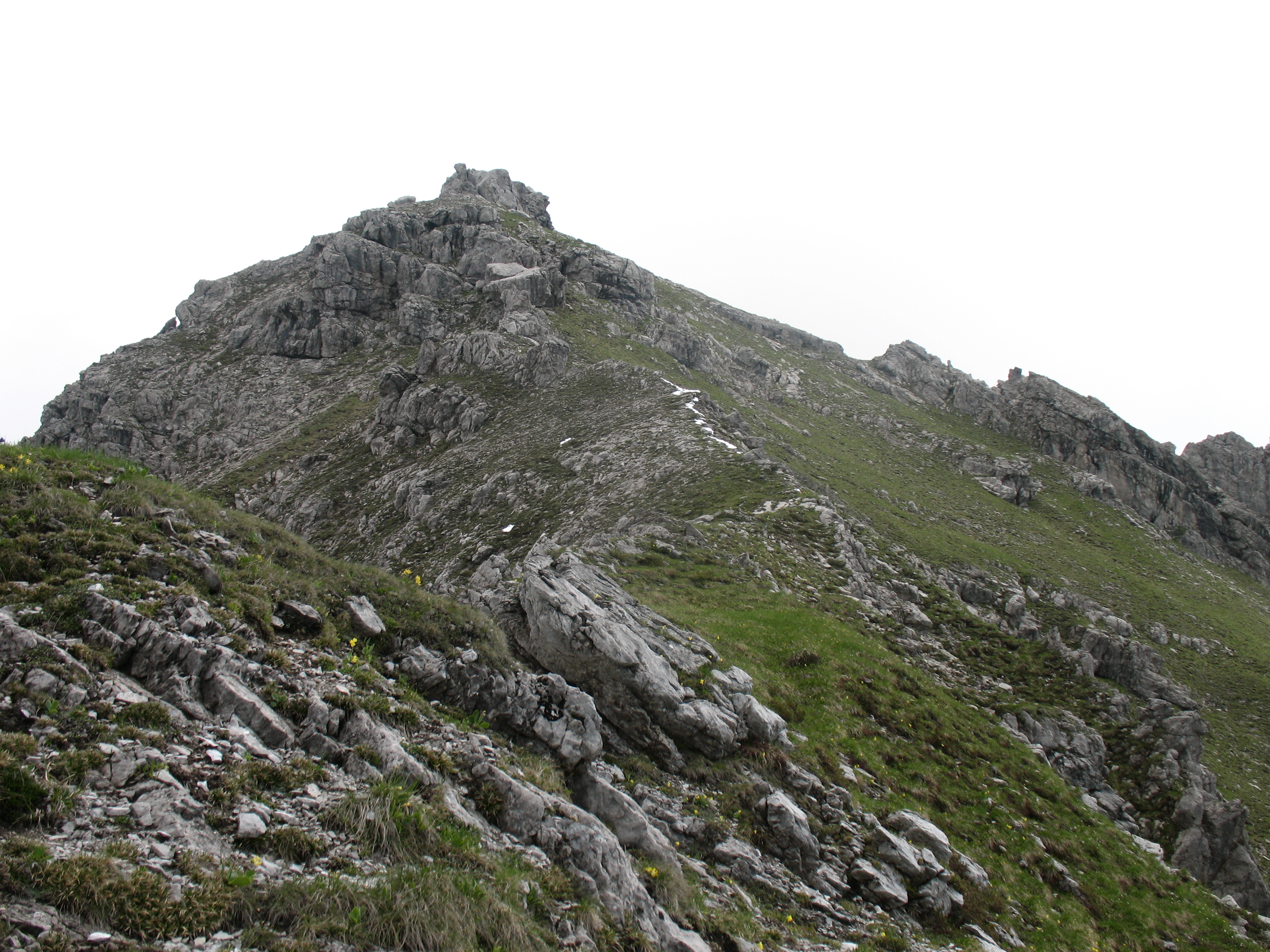
Southwest Arête

== Literature ==
- Thaddäus Steiner: Allgäuer Bergnamen, Lindenberg, Kunstverlag Josef Fink, 2007, ISBN 978-3-89870-389-5
- Thaddäus Steiner: Die Flurnamen der Gemeinde Oberstdorf im Allgäu, München, Selbstverlag des Verbandes für Flurnamenforschung in Bayern, 1972
- Zettler/Groth: Alpenvereinsführer Allgäuer Alpen. Munich, Bergverlag Rudolf Rother, 1984. ISBN 3-7633-1111-4
