= Kemptner Kopf =

Coordinates: 47°18′N 10°12′E

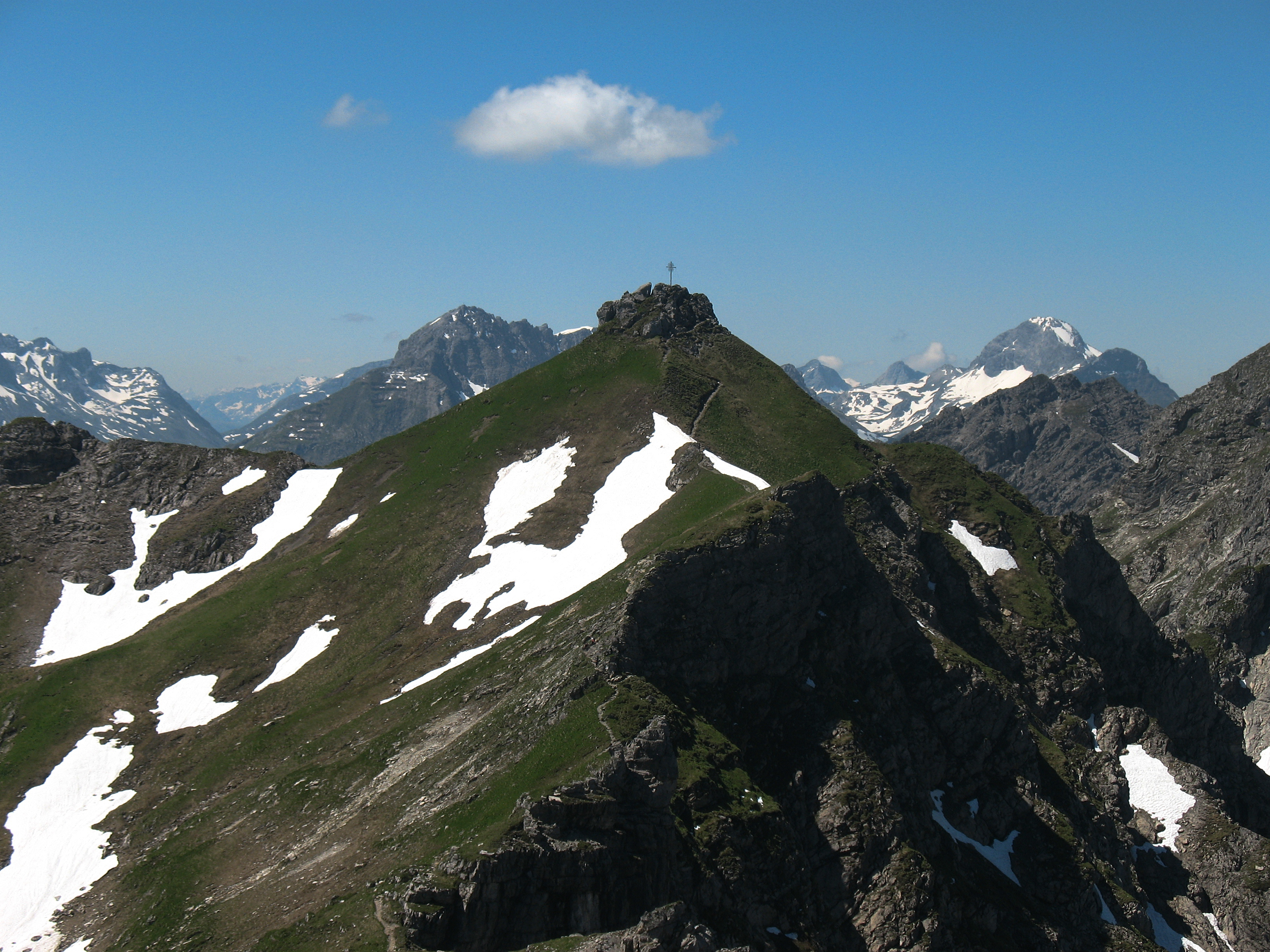
- Kemptner Kopf amongst other mountain tops

Highest point
- Elevation: 2,191 m (7,188 ft)

Geography
- Location: Bavaria, Germany

Kemptner Kopf is a mountain of Bavaria, Germany.
