= Roßgundkopf =

Mountain in Bavaria, Germany

Coordinates: 47°19′09″N 10°13′59″E

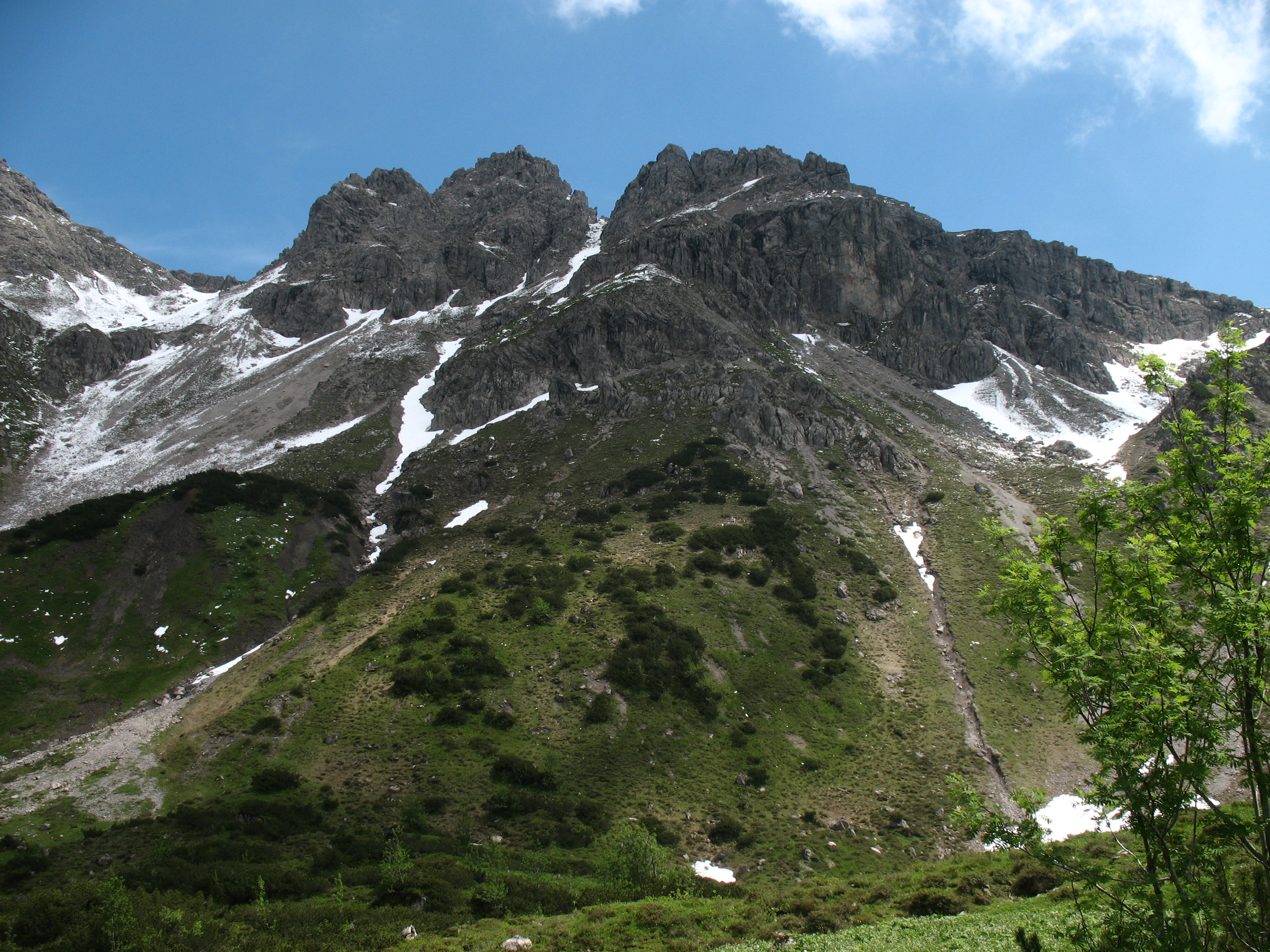

Highest point
- Elevation: 2,139 m (7,018 ft)

Geography
- Location: Bavaria, Germany

Roßgundkopf is a mountain of Bavaria, Germany.
