= Third Schafalpenkopf =

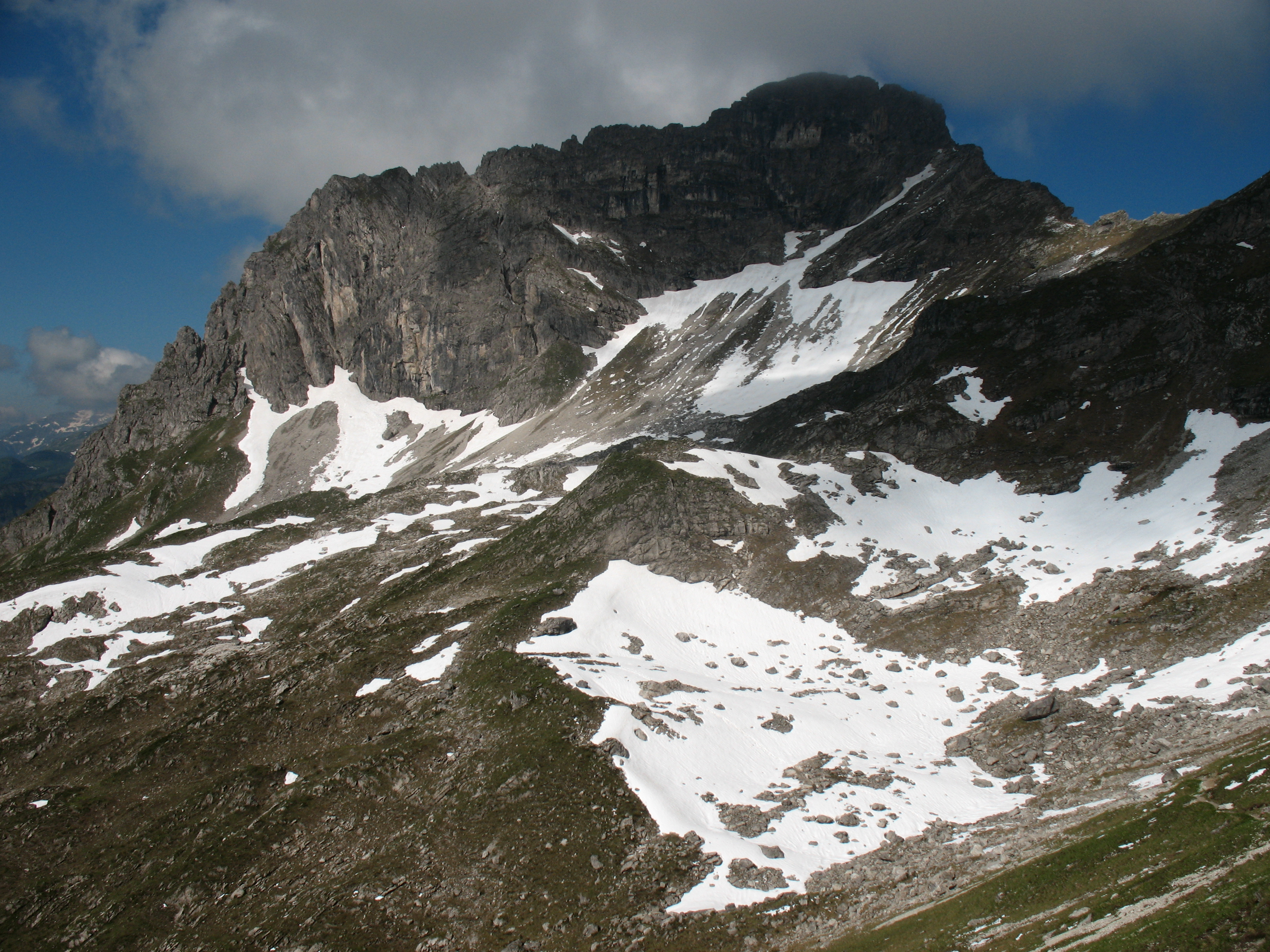
- From the northeast over the Saubuckeln

Highest point
- Elevation: 2,320 m above sea level (NHN) (7,610 ft)
- Prominence: 216 m ↓ Kemptner Scharte
- Isolation: 2.9 km → Elfer
- Coordinates: 47°18′37″N 10°13′00″E

Geography
- Location within Alps
- Location: Bavaria, Germany
- Parent range: Southeastern Walsertal Mountains, Allgäuer Alpen

Geology
- Rock type: main dolomite

Climbing
- Normal route: Mindelheim Klettersteig

The Third Schafalpenkopf (German: Dritte Schafalpenkopf), Highest Schafalpenkopf (Höchster Schafalpenkopf) or Northeastern Schafalpenkopf (Nordöstlicher Schafalpenkopf) is a 2,320-metre-high mountain in the Allgäu Alps. It is part of the Mindelheimer Klettersteig.

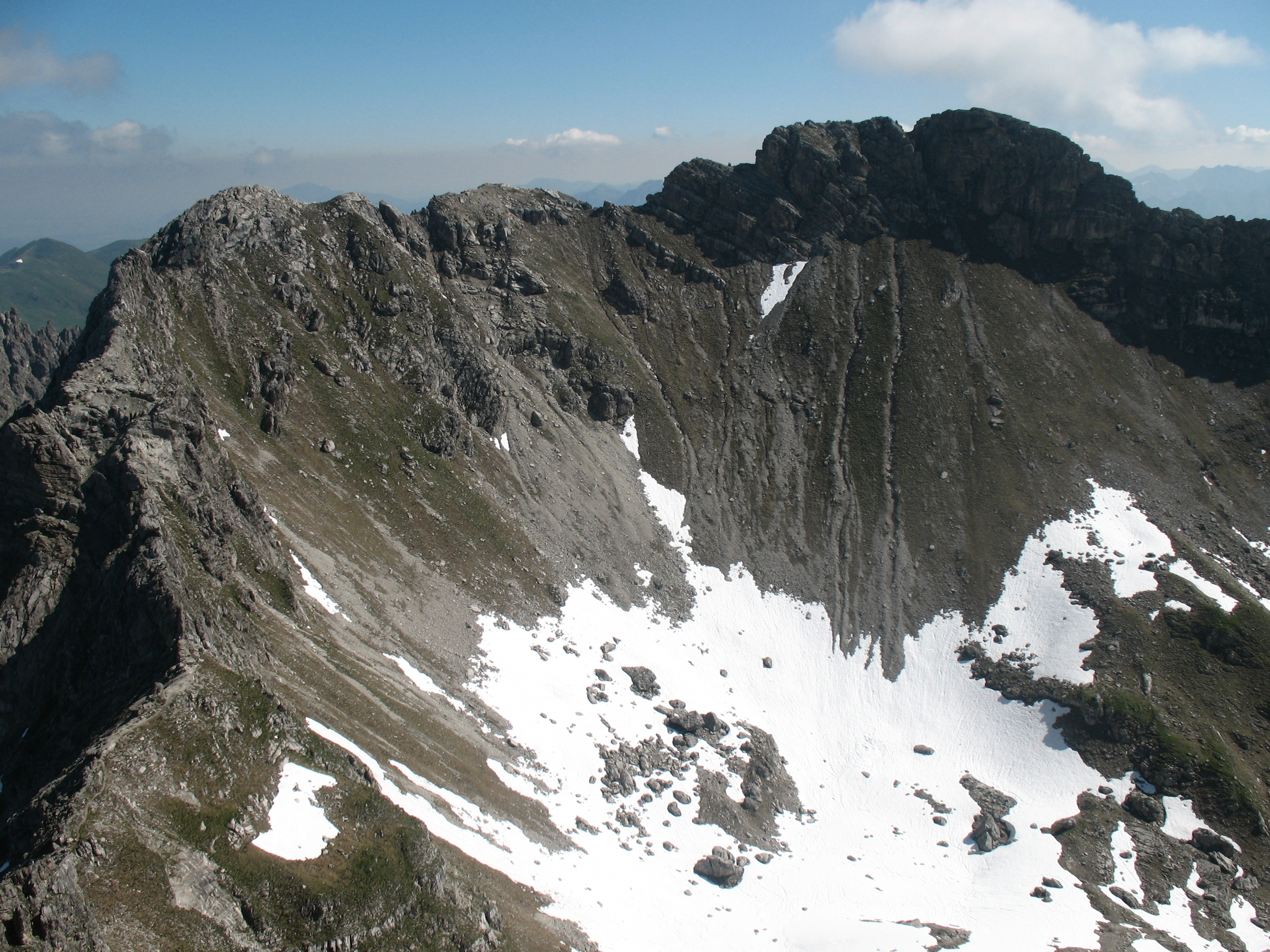
From the southwest with the Großer Wanne

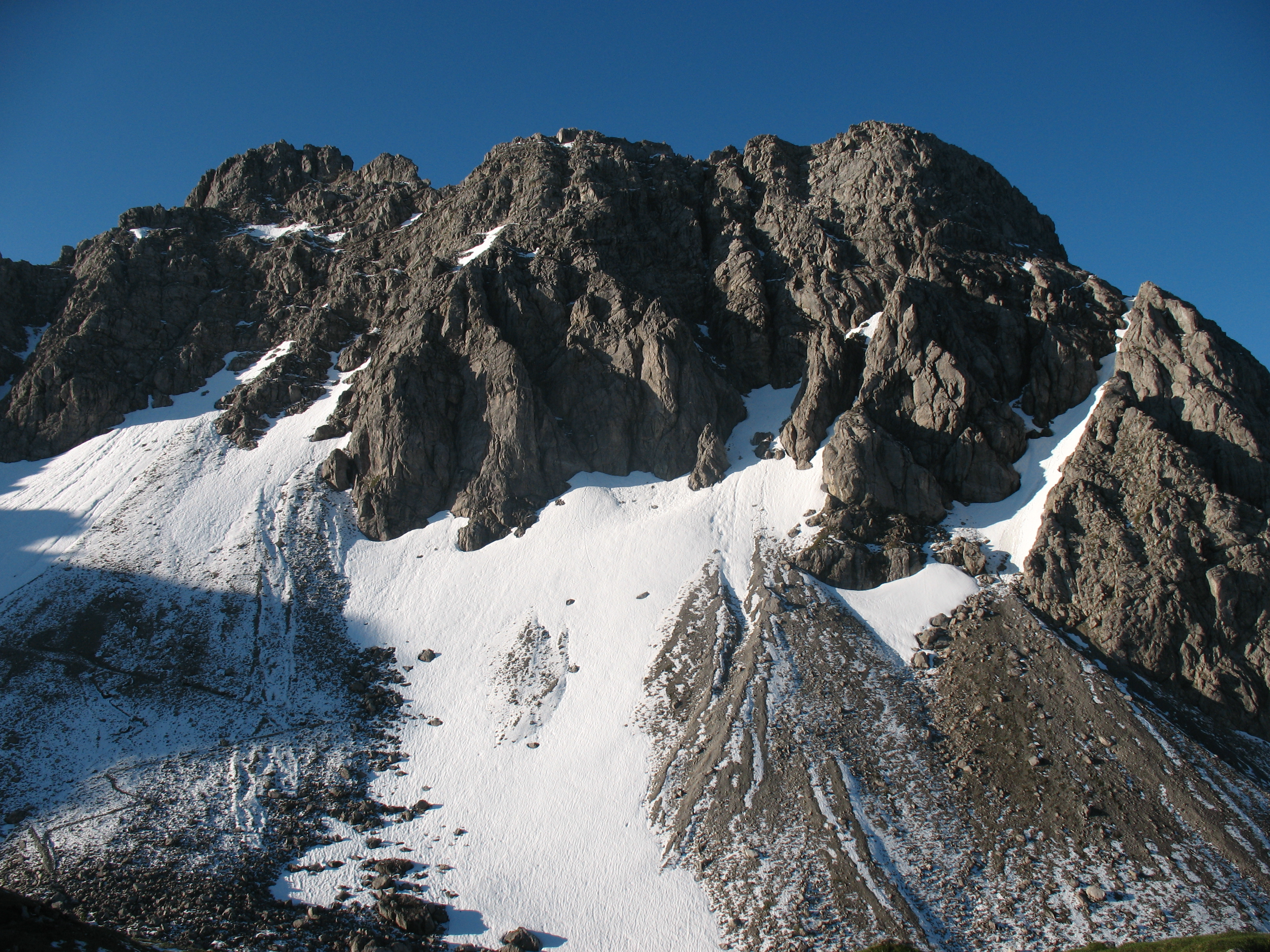
From the Fiderepass Hut

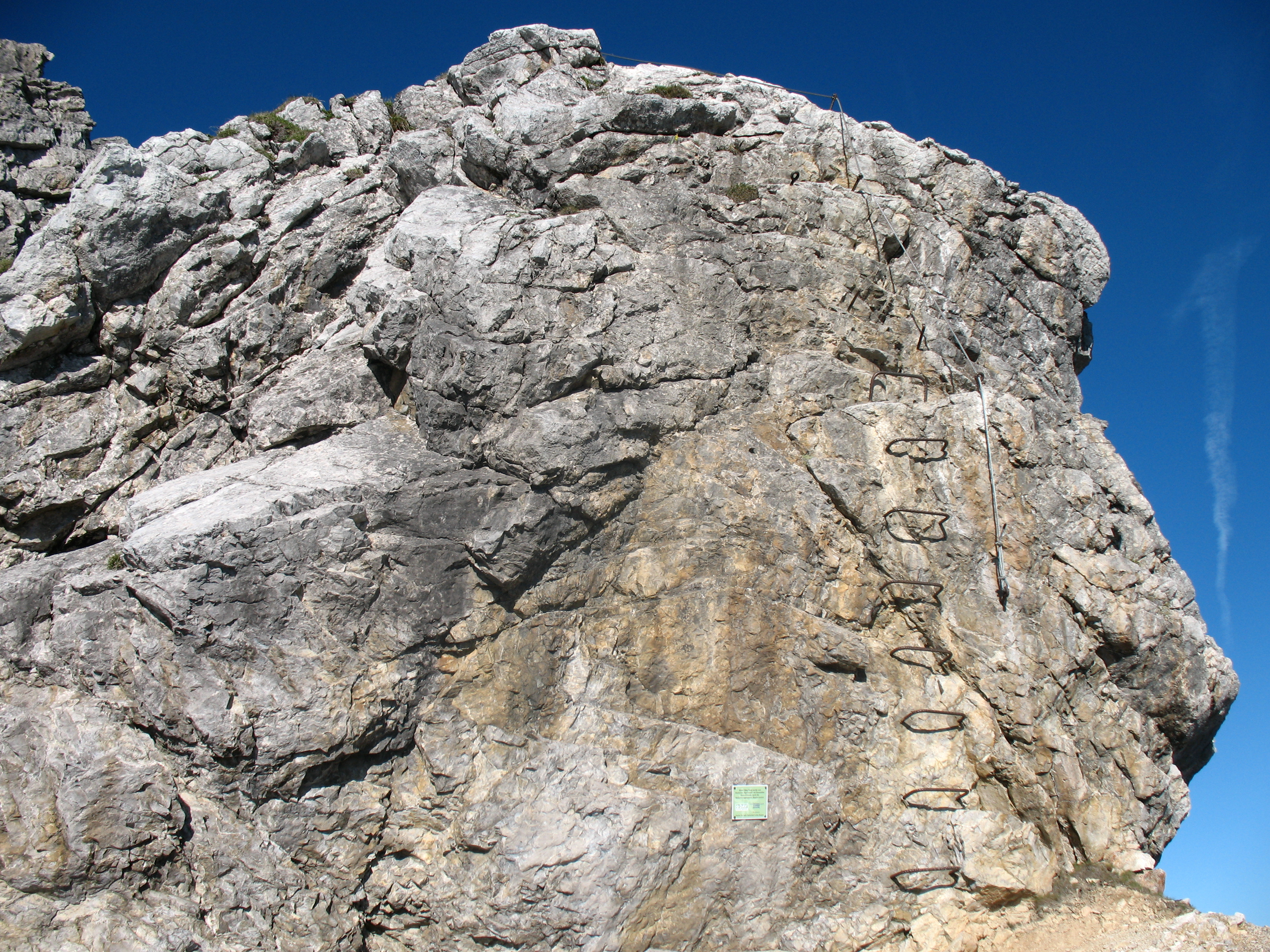
Klettersteig entrance

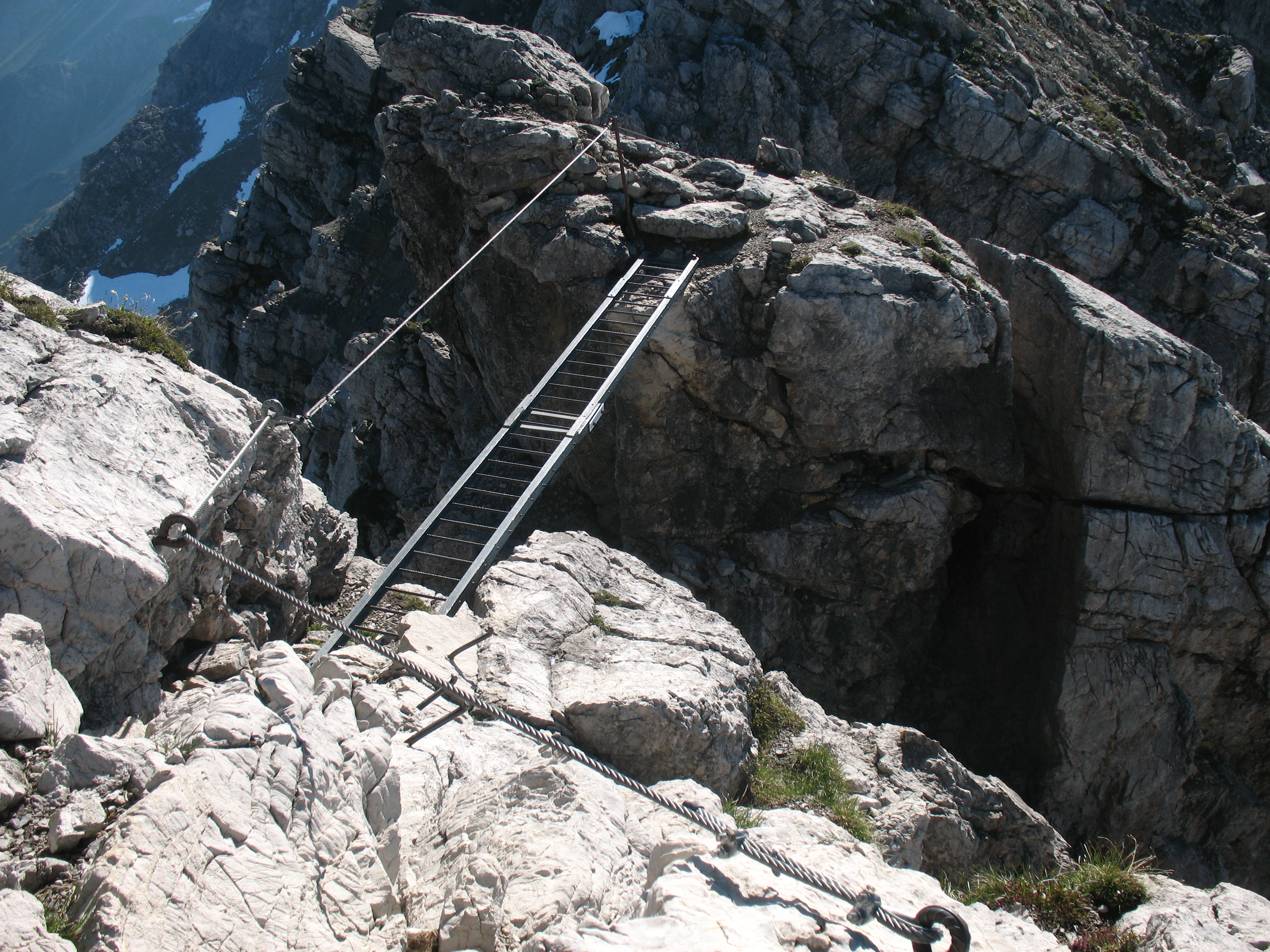
Ladder bridge at the summit
