= Walser Hammerspitze =

Mountain in Bavaria, Germany

Coordinates: 47°20′N 10°12′E

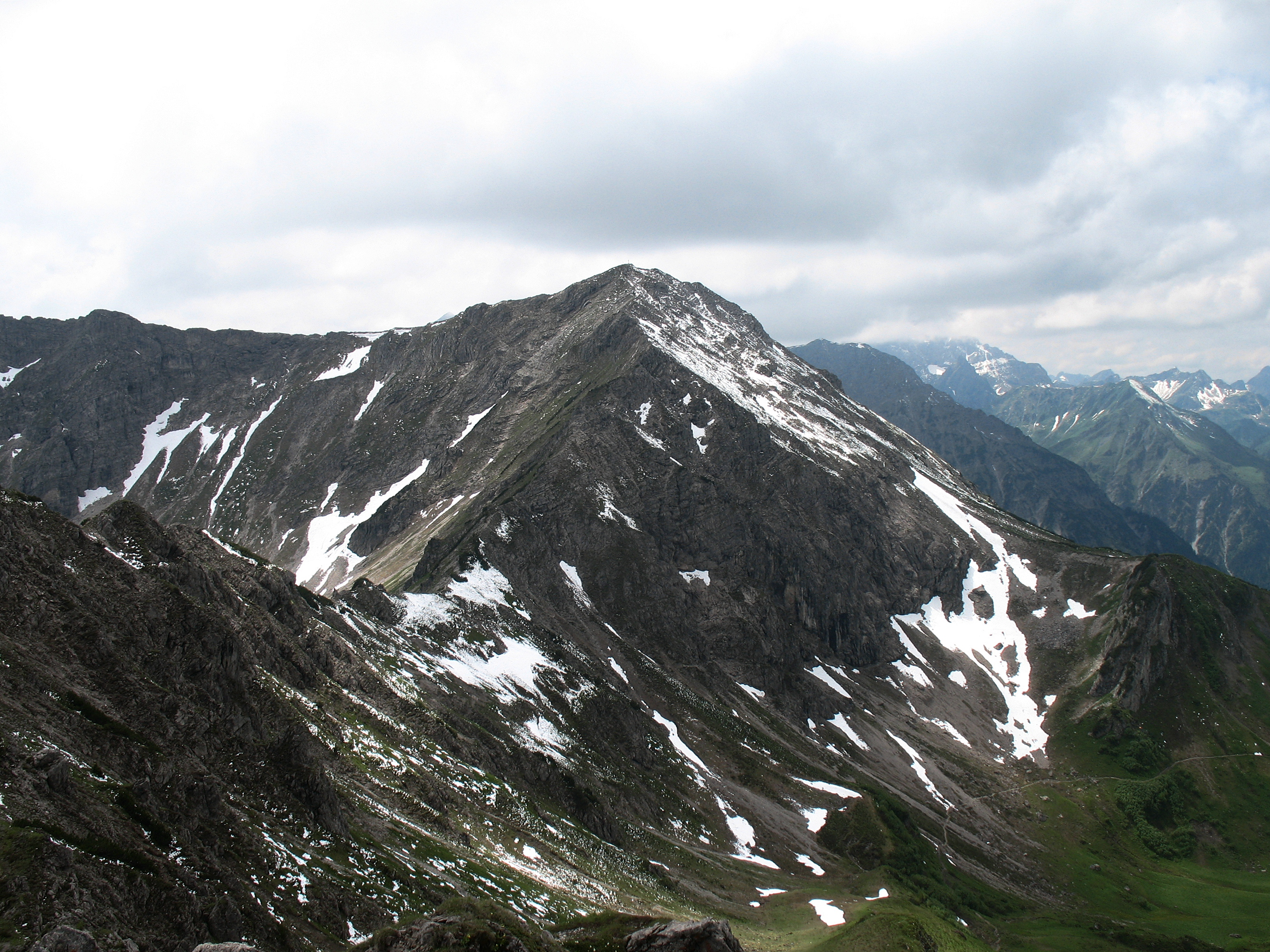

Highest point
- Elevation: 2,170 m (7,120 ft)

Geography
- Location: Bavaria, Germany

Walser Hammerspitze is a mountain of Bavaria, Germany. The former name was Schüsser.
