= Muenster =

Muenster may refer to:

== Places ==
- Münster, Germany
- Muenster, Saskatchewan
- Muenster, Texas

== People ==
- Karen Muenster (1942–2026), American politician and businesswoman
- Mary Kathryn Muenster (born 1967), American philanthropist and civic leader
- Ted Muenster, American businessman

== Other ==
- Muenster cheese

== See also ==
- Munster (disambiguation)
