= JB Pritzker =

Governor of Illinois since 2019

- Official portrait, 2026

43rd Governor of Illinois
- Incumbent
- Assumed office January 14, 2019
- Lieutenant: Juliana Stratton; Christian Mitchell (elect)
- Preceded by: Bruce Rauner

Personal details
- Born: Jay Robert Pritzker; January 19, 1965 (age 61) Palo Alto, California, U.S.
- Party: Democratic
- Spouse: Mary Kathryn Muenster (m. 1993)
- Children: 2
- Parent(s): Donald Pritzker; Sue Sandel
- Relatives: Pritzker family
- Education: Georgetown University; Duke University (BA); Northwestern University (JD)
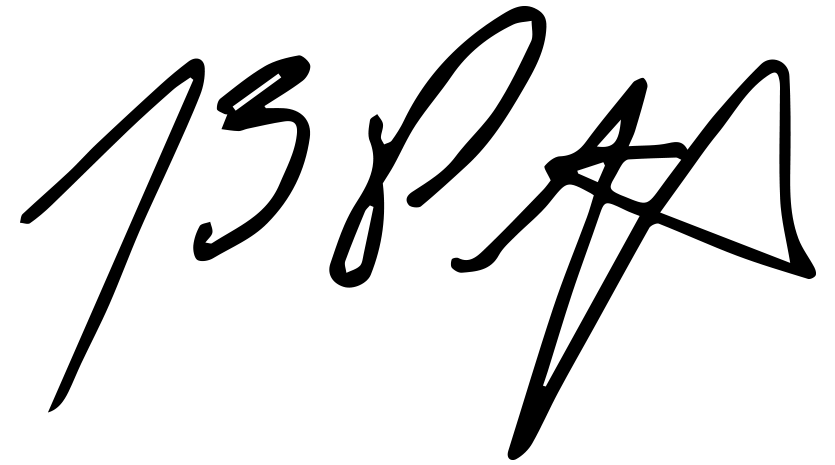
- Signature
- Website: Office website Campaign website
- Pritzker's voice Pritzker on the economy of Illinois. Recorded March 2, 2022

Jay Robert Pritzker (born January 19, 1965) is an American politician, businessman, and billionaire serving since 2019 as the 43rd governor of Illinois. He is a member of the Democratic Party.

The Pritzker family owns the Hyatt hotel chain, and JB Pritzker helped create several Chicago-based venture capital and investment startups. He was also active in politics decades before serving in elected office. After an unsuccessful 1998 bid for Illinois's 9th congressional district, Pritzker became a major financial supporter of candidates and served as a national co-chair of Hillary Clinton's 2008 presidential campaign. According to Forbes, as of August 2025, his estimated net worth is $3.9 billion. This makes him the second-wealthiest U.S. elected official, behind President Donald Trump.

Pritzker won a crowded Democratic primary for governor of Illinois in the 2018 election and defeated Republican incumbent Bruce Rauner in the general election. He was reelected in 2022, defeating Darren Bailey. He defeated Bailey again in 2026. A progressive Democrat, he has legalized recreational cannabis, raised the minimum wage, expanded abortion access, and unsuccessfully sought to implement income tax reforms. During his second term, Pritzker has become a prominent critic of the second Trump administration.

Pritzker is the only Democratic governor of Illinois to be elected to a third term.

== Early life, family, and education ==
Pritzker was born in Palo Alto, California, on January 19, 1965. He is the son of Donald Pritzker and Sue Pritzker (née Sandel). Pritzker is named after his paternal uncles, Jay Pritzker and Robert Pritzker, and is known by his initials ("JB" for "Jay Bob"). He has two older siblings: Anthony and Penny, the latter of whom served as the United States Secretary of Commerce under Barack Obama.

Pritzker is a member of the Pritzker family, a Jewish family of Ukrainian descent that was prominent in business and philanthropy during the late 20th century. The Pritzkers have consistently ranked near the top of the Forbes "America's Richest Families" list since its inception in 1982.

Pritzker was raised in Atherton, California. His father, Donald, was the president of Hyatt, a hotel chain owned by the Pritzker family. Donald was credited with growing Hyatt into the nation's fifth-largest hotel chain at the time of his death. Pritzker's parents were also active in Democratic politics in California. Pritzker later credited this exposure with spurring his own interest in politics.

In 1972, Donald Pritzker died of a heart attack at age 39. After his father died, Pritzker's mother struggled with alcoholism and depression. As a result, at age 12, Pritzker moved to Chicago to live with his aunt and uncle, Jay and Cindy Pritzker. He graduated from Milton Academy, a boarding school in Massachusetts, and attended Georgetown University for one year before transferring to Duke University, from which he graduated with a Bachelor of Arts in political science. He returned to Chicago and earned his Juris Doctor from the Northwestern University School of Law in 1993.

== Business and philanthropy career ==
Pritzker co-founded Pritzker Group Private Capital with his brother Anthony Pritzker, serving as managing partner before stepping down in 2017 to run for governor. Anthony Pritzker reported that the Pritzker Group generated a return of 28.7% from 2007 to 2012, focusing on investing in family businesses and other entrepreneurial enterprises. In 2008, he received the Chicagoland Chamber of Commerce's Entrepreneurial Champion Award for his efforts to promote economic development and job creation.

Pritzker served as chairman of ChicagoNEXT, then-Chicago Mayor Rahm Emanuel's Council on Innovation and Technology, and founded 1871, a nonprofit digital startup incubator, which, as of February 2025, had created 15,000 jobs and raised $4 billion in venture capital, according to a memo by its CEO, Betsy Ziegler. He was involved in the creation of the Illinois Venture Capital Association and the Chicagoland Entrepreneurial Center. He also co-founded Chicago Ventures and funded the startups Techstars Chicago and Built in Chicago. Pritzker is a member of the Illinois State Bar Association and the Chicago Bar Association.

He has also been active in philanthropy. The J.B. and M.K. Pritzker Family Foundation, founded in 2001, has given millions of dollars to numerous causes, particularly early-childhood education. Most notably, in 2015, the foundation gave $100 million to the Northwestern Law School, which was renamed the Pritzker Law School.

== Early political involvement ==
=== 1980s and 1990s ===
Pritzker first became involved in politics while an undergraduate student at Duke University, volunteering for Terry Sanford's 1986 campaign for the U.S. Senate. After graduating from Duke in 1987, Pritzker moved to Washington, D.C., to work on Capitol Hill. He served on the legislative staffs of Congressman Tom Lantos of California and Senator Alan J. Dixon of Illinois, focusing on trade and transportation issues. After his career as a staffer, Pritzker founded Democratic Leadership for the 21st century, a national organization dedicated to attracting voters under 40 to the Democratic Party, in 1991.

Anticipating that Sidney Yates, the longtime Democratic incumbent in Illinois's 9th congressional district, might retire instead of seeking reelection, Pritzker laid the groundwork for possible 1994 and 1996 campaigns for his seat. Each time, there was public speculation about whether Yates would retire, but he ultimately ran for reelection. Each time, after Yates announced his intention to run, Pritzker abandoned his plans to run. Pritzker established a campaign committee in 1993. By the end of the 1996 cycle, the committee had raised more than $120,000 and spent most of this money on operating expenditures.

==== 1998 congressional campaign ====
In 1998, Yates opted to forgo reelection, and Pritzker ran in the Democratic primary to succeed him, reconstituting his campaign committee in April 1997. Also running in the primary were state representative Jan Schakowsky and state senator Howard W. Carroll. The district covered the northern lakefront of Chicago, as well as the suburbs of Evanston and Skokie. It had a large Jewish electorate and had long been regarded as the "Jewish seat" in Illinois's congressional delegation. Yates was Jewish, as were all three Democratic contenders to succeed him. The district had been described as being among the most liberal in the country.

Journalist James Ylisela Jr. observed that Pritzker, Schakowsky, and Carroll largely all ran on platforms aligned with the "liberal Democratic Party agenda" that Yates had championed. But the Chicago Tribune wrote that Pritzker and Carroll ran on more moderate platforms than Schakowsky, and therefore potentially wound up competing with each other for many of the same voters.

At the time, the election was one of the most expensive congressional primaries in U.S. history, and Pritzker spent nearly $1 million of his own money on his campaign. This included $500,000 on television ads in the Chicago market. He finished third among five candidates in the Democratic primary, with 20.5% of the vote to Schakowsky's 45.1% and Carroll's 34.4%. Schakowsky went on to represent the district for 28 years, retiring after the 2026 election.

=== 2000s and 2010s ===
==== Hillary Clinton's 2008 and 2016 presidential campaigns ====
After running for Congress in 1998, Pritzker transitioned away from electoral politics, becoming a significant donor to Democratic candidates. In this role he first met former First Lady and then-U.S. Senator Hillary Clinton, hosting a fundraiser at his Chicago home for her 2006 reelection campaign.

When Clinton ran for president in 2008, she named Pritzker a national co-chair of her campaign. After Clinton withdrew from the race, he supported the party's nominee, Barack Obama, helping merge the Clinton and Obama campaigns in Illinois.

While Pritzker had no official role in Clinton's 2016 presidential campaign, he was one of her largest donors, giving more than $17.5 million to her super PAC and campaign combined. Pritzker and his wife were also in attendance at Clinton's watch party in the Javits Center when she conceded the 2016 election to Donald Trump.

==== Relationship with Rod Blagojevich ====
Illinois Governor Rod Blagojevich appointed Pritzker to chair the Illinois Human Rights Commission in 2003. He held that position until 2006. After Pritzker left the chairmanship, Blagojevich appointed former White House counsel and federal judge Abner J. Mikva to succeed him.

A controversial phone call between Pritzker and Blagojevich, which was recorded on an FBI wiretap, took place during the 2008 corruption scandal. The Chicago Tribune described Pritzker at the time as a "businessman with political ambitions". On the call, Blagojevich asked Pritzker whether he would like to be appointed state treasurer, to which Pritzker responded, "Yeah, that's the one I would want." He and Blagojevich also discussed filling Barack Obama's U.S. Senate seat, with Pritzker saying that appointing then-Secretary of State Jesse White would "cover you on the African-American thing" and that he was the "least offensive" Black candidate.

After the Tribune released the recording during the 2018 gubernatorial election, Governor Bruce Rauner and Pritzker's Democratic primary opponents criticized his conduct. Pritzker responded: "I've not been accused of any wrongdoing. I have not done anything wrong." Law enforcement made no allegations of wrongdoing against Pritzker, and he has said: "over decades of my life, I have been doing public service, and the opportunity to continue to do public service as treasurer of the state was something that had been brought up, and so there was a conversation about that." Pritzker later apologized for certain comments he made in the recorded conversation. After the recording was released, White continued to support Pritzker in his 2018 gubernatorial campaign and accepted his apology, saying he knew "where his heart is" and "I consider him a very good friend".

== Gubernatorial campaigns ==
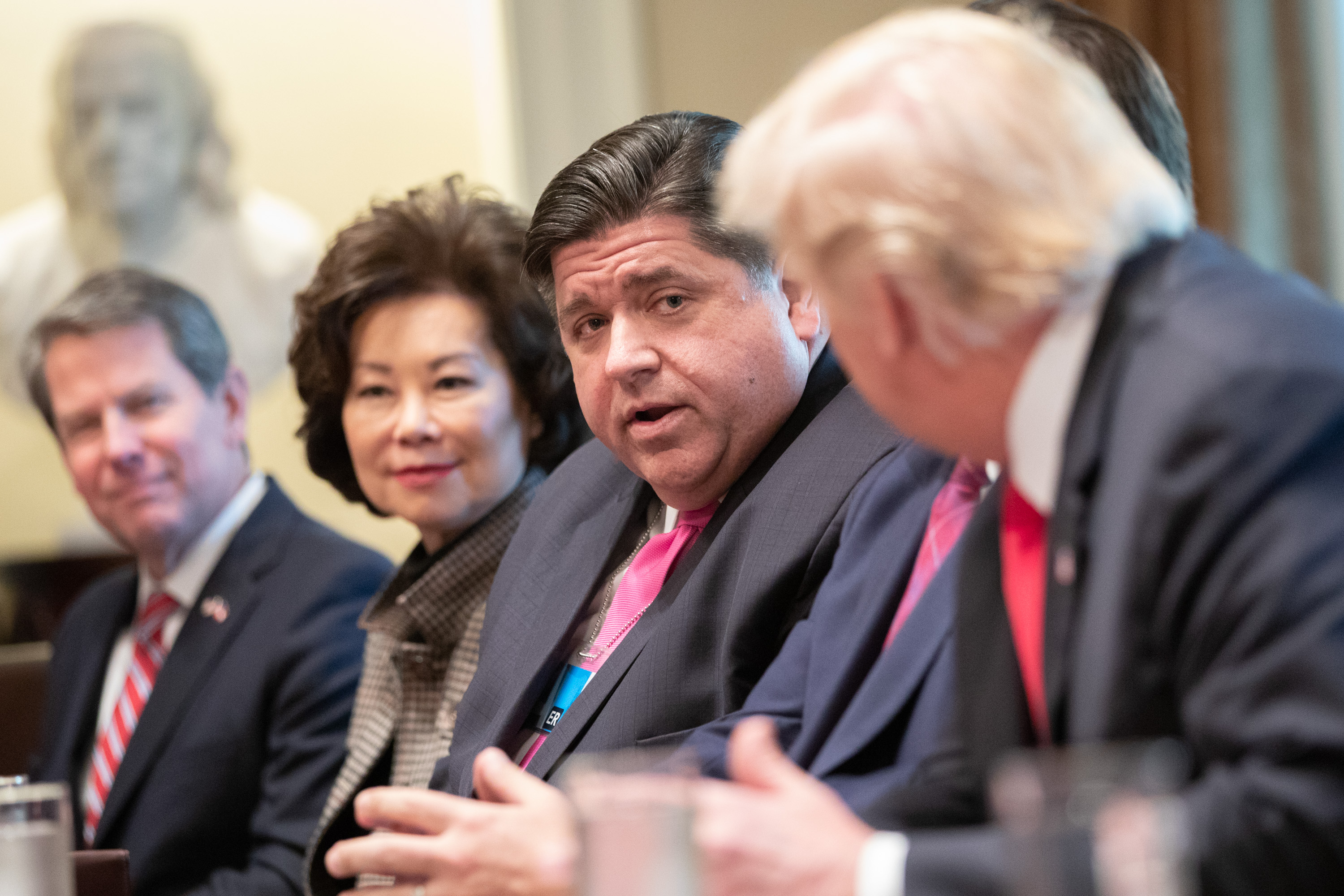
Pritzker among other governors-elect meeting with President Donald Trump in 2018

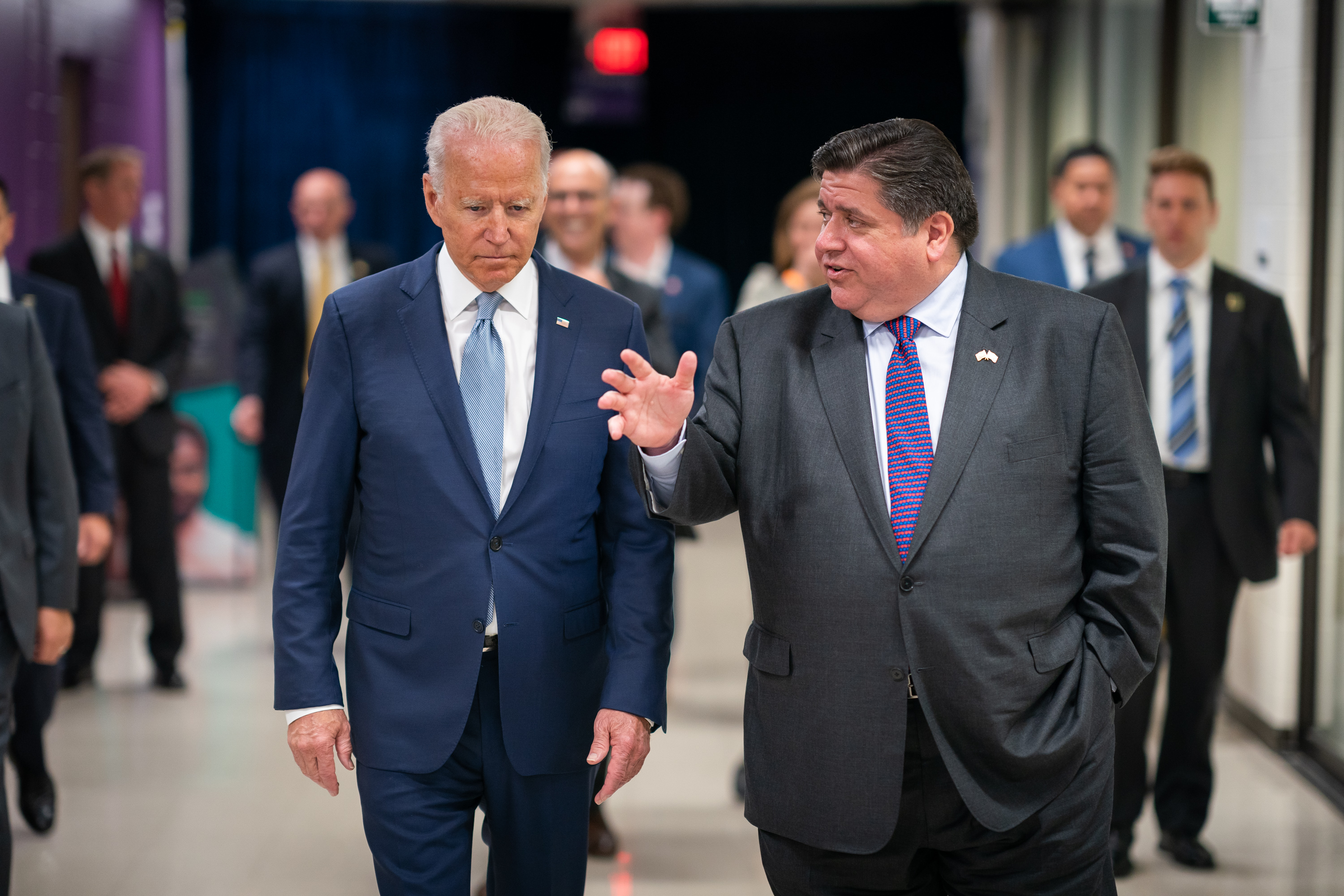
President Joe Biden and Governor Pritzker in 2021

=== Elections ===
==== 2018 ====
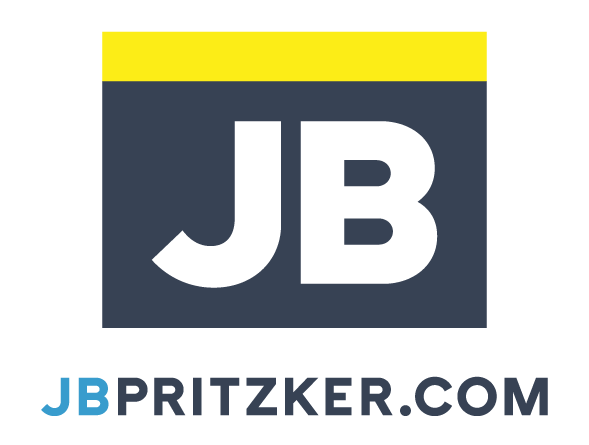
Campaign logo used by Pritzker

On April 6, 2017, Pritzker announced his candidacy for the Democratic nomination for governor of Illinois. He was endorsed by Illinois Secretary of State Jesse White, Illinois Congressman Luis Gutiérrez, former Illinois Congressman Glenn Poshard, more than a dozen members of the Illinois General Assembly, 21 local labor unions, and the Illinois AFL–CIO.

On August 10, 2017, Pritzker announced that his running mate would be freshman state representative and fellow Chicago resident Juliana Stratton. By December 2017, Pritzker had spent $42 million of his own money on his campaign without receiving funding from any other source. On March 20, 2018, he won the Democratic primary with 45.13% of the vote, defeating five opponents. On November 6, 2018, Pritzker defeated incumbent Republican governor Bruce Rauner in the general election, receiving 54.53% of the vote to Rauner's 38.83%. Pritzker was well ahead of Rauner in most polls from the summer of 2018 onward, and won by the largest margin in a gubernatorial race since 1994.

Pritzker spent $171.5 million of his own money on his campaign, primarily on digital outreach, television advertising, and staff.

Pritzker was inaugurated as Illinois's 43rd governor on January 14, 2019. With an estimated net worth of $3.6 billion in January 2019, he became the richest politician in the U.S. His second term in office began on January 9, 2023.

==== 2022 ====
In June 2021, it was reported that Pritzker was considering retiring after one term in office. But on July 19, he confirmed on Twitter that he would run for reelection, with Stratton again as his running mate. He won the June 28 Democratic primary and defeated Republican nominee Darren Bailey in the November 8 general election, 54.91% to 42.37%. He is the first Illinois governor to have been elected to a second term since 2006, when Rod Blagojevich was reelected. If Pritzker serves two full terms, he will be the first governor to do so since Jim Edgar and the first Democratic governor in Illinois history to do so, as every other Democratic governor was impeached, died, or resigned before finishing a second term.

In 2024, Pritzker was mentioned as a possible running mate for Kamala Harris in her 2024 presidential campaign, but Minnesota Governor Tim Walz was chosen instead.

==== 2026 ====
On June 26, 2025, Pritzker announced he would seek a third term as governor. With incumbent Lieutenant Governor Juliana Stratton running for U.S. Senate, Pritzker chose former state representative Christian Mitchell as his running mate.

Pritzker and Mitchell ran unopposed in the March Democratic primary, winning 100% of the vote.

Pritzker was reelected in the November general election, becoming the first Illinois governor to win a third term since Jim Thompson in 1986, and the first Democrat to do so in Illinois history. The election was a rematch between Pritzker and Darren Bailey, whom he had defeated in the 2022 gubernatorial election. In September 2026, alongside his gubernatorial campaign, Pritzker launched and served as the honorary chair of the Ready For The Fight political action committee, which supported federal Democratic campaigns, including senator-elects Scott Colom of Mississippi and Annie Andrews of South Carolina, in the 2026 US midterm election.

== Governor of Illinois (2019–present) ==
=== Cabinet ===
The Pritzker Cabinet
Office	Name	Term
Governor	JB Pritzker	2019–present
Lieutenant Governor	Juliana Stratton	2019–present
Director of Revenue	David C. Harris	2019–present
Secretary of Transportation	Omer Osman	2019–2024
Gia Biagi	2024-present
Director of Children and Family; Services	Marc D. Smith	2019–present
Heidi E. Mueller	2024-present
Director of Agriculture	John M. Sullivan	2019–2020
Jerry Costello II	2020–present
Director of Veterans' Affairs	Col. Jaime Martinez	2019
Linda Chapa LaVia	2019–2021
Terry Prince	2021–present
Director of Natural Resources	Colleen Callahan	2019–2023
Natalie P. Finnie	2023–present
Director of Public Health	Ngozi Ezike	2019–2022
Amaal Tokers	2022 (acting)
Sameer Vohra	2022-present
Secretary of Human Services	Grace B. Hou	2019–2023
Dulce M. Quintero	2023-present
Director of Labor	Michael Kleinik	2019–2022
Jane R. Flanagan	2022–present
Director of Healthcare and Family; Services	Theresa Eagleson	2019–present
Elizabeth Whitehorn	2024-present
Director of Central Management; Services	Janel Forde	2019–2022
Anthony Pascente	2022-2023 (acting)
Raven DeVaughn	2023-present
Fire Marshal of Illinois	Matt Perez	2015-2022
Dale Simpson	2022-2023 (acting)
James Rivera	2023–2025
Michele Pankow	2025-present
Director of Commerce and Economic Opportunity	Erin Guthrie	2019–2021
Sylvia Garcia	2021–2023
Kristin Richards	2023–present

=== FY 2019–20 ===
On June 5, 2019, Pritzker signed a bipartisan $40 billion balanced budget for the 2019–20 fiscal year. The budget included $29 million in additional funding for efforts to encourage participation in the U.S. Census. Public spending increases were paid for by tax increases. A separate bill Pritzker signed imposed sales taxes on online retailers, a tax on insurance companies, and decoupled the Illinois state income tax from a federal tax cut for companies that bring their foreign profits to the U.S. The budget neglected any potential revenue that might be collected from the legalization of recreational marijuana. In addition, people who owed taxes from between June 30, 2011, and July 1, 2018, were able to take advantage of a "tax amnesty" program that allowed them to pay without penalty. The governor's office had expected a $150 million surplus, which it planned to use to pay down the state's $6 billion backlog of unpaid bills.

=== Abortion legislation ===
In June 2019, Pritzker signed into law Senate Bill 25, or the Reproductive Health Act. The act repealed the Illinois Abortion Law of 1975, which penalized doctors for performing abortions considered "unnecessary", and the "Partial-Birth Abortion Ban Act". The new bill ensured the "fundamental right to make autonomous decisions about one's own reproductive health", specifically the right to choose whether to carry a pregnancy to term or to terminate it, and denies a zygote, an embryo, or a fetus "independent rights under the law" of the State of Illinois. Pritzker encouraged other states that had passed restrictions on abortion to reconsider their positions and said that women from other states could access medical services in Illinois.

After Dobbs v. Jackson overturned Roe v. Wade in 2022, Illinois became an abortion-access state for people in the South and Midwest whose states ban abortion, with 30% of abortions being for out-of-state residents. Abortions in Illinois increased by over 45% in the year after Roe was overturned, primarily due to patients' traveling from states with abortion bans.

In 2024, Pritzker signed the Birth Equity Act, which required Illinois-based health insurance providers to cover abortion care without copayments or deductibles. On June 24, 2026, Pritzker signed the Reproductive Health Records Privacy Act, a law that protects those seeking abortions in Illinois by shielding digital medical records from out-of-state entities, effective July 1, 2027.

=== AI and data center regulation ===
In June 2026, Pritzker announced that the Illinois Department of Commerce and Economic Opportunity would suspend new state tax incentives for data center construction starting on July 1, 2026. The announcement came after the Illinois General Assembly failed to pass the POWER Act, which was legislation that would have required data centers to pay for and supply their own renewable energy, enter community benefits agreements, and report water usage. Pritzker took unilateral action after Speaker of Illinois House of Representatives Chris Welch said the pause did not have the House Democratic Caucus's support. Pritzker also said he opposed future "hyperscale" data centers in Illinois and rejected the idea of selling farmland to data center companies.

On July 6, 2026, Pritzker signed into law Senate Bill 315, the Artificial Intelligence Safety Measures Act. The law regulates artificial intelligence (AI) with transparency and accountability rules for companies producing the largest AI models. The law was the first in the nation to require mandatory annual third-party audits and was opposed by TechNet, a coalition of technology sector executives, during debate in the Illinois General Assembly. The law was supported by artificial intelligence companies Anthropic and OpenAI and passed with bipartisan support, with only five state senators, all Republicans, voting against it. On September 22, 2026, Pritzker established an "AI Cabinet" to explore regulations on artificial intelligence.

=== Cannabis ===
On May 31, 2019, the Illinois General Assembly passed the Illinois Cannabis Regulation and Tax Act legalizing and regulating the production, consumption, and sale of adult-use cannabis. On June 25, 2019, Pritzker signed the legislation into law, which went into effect on January 1, 2020. Illinois was the 11th U.S. state to legalize recreational use of cannabis. Criminal records of people caught possessing less than 30 grams (0.066 lb) were cleared. Tax revenue collected from cannabis sales is used to invest in impoverished communities affected by the war on drugs and in drug rehabilitation programs. After the first month of legalization, cannabis sales generated approximately $10.4 million in tax revenue. Cannabis sales were over $52 million by July 2020, $445.3 million by the end of 2022, and $2 billion by the end of 2024, which generated about $490 million in sales tax revenue.

On December 31, 2019, Pritzker pardoned approximately 11,000 people for low-level cannabis convictions. In 2020, Pritzker pardoned an additional 9,200 people with low-level cannabis convictions and expunged the arrest records of 490,000 convictions related to cannabis.

=== Child welfare and education ===
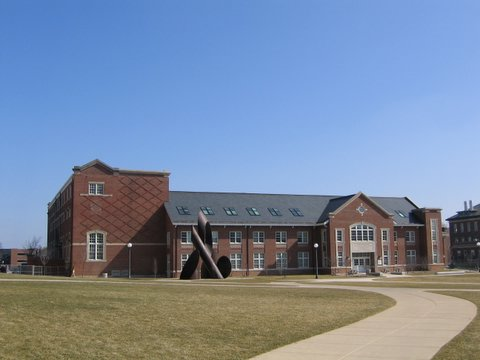
The Rebuild Illinois capital plan allocated $3.2 billion for public colleges and universities. Pictured: Mechanical Engineering Laboratory, University of Illinois Urbana-Champaign

In the balanced budget for the 2019–20 fiscal year, worth $40 billion, the State of Illinois authorized more spending on education, including grade schools, community colleges, and state universities. Funding for grade schools rose by nearly $379 million, more than the $29 million required by the new state funding for education formula passed the previous year. Funding for community colleges increased by $14 million, and funding for public universities by $53 million. Grants for low-income students received a bump of $50 billion. The Illinois Department of Children and Family Services, facing financial pressure, received $80 million for hiring new staff and improving services. Moreover, the Rebuild Illinois capital plan spent $3.2 billion on public colleges and universities over six years.

Pritzker created the College Student Credit Card Marketing and Debt Task Force (House Bill 1581), whose task it is to look for ways to help students reduce their credit card debts after graduation from an institution of higher education in the state. The task force was to report its findings to the General Assembly by December 4, 2019.

Pritzker created a job training program for community colleges funded based on the percentage of low-income students attending. It launched in 2020.

In July 2019, Pritzker signed House Bill 2512. Approved unanimously by both chambers of the Illinois General Assembly, it requires state universities to report what students pay in tuition fees to the Illinois Board of Higher Education. This is intended to increase transparency in the costs of higher education.

In 2023, lawmakers approved Pritzker's Smart Start Illinois program, providing expanded public funding for preschool programs and for child care providers. The program increased the number of preschool seats available to 80% of all working families, with 11,000 additional preschool seats added as of January 2025.

=== COVID-19 pandemic ===
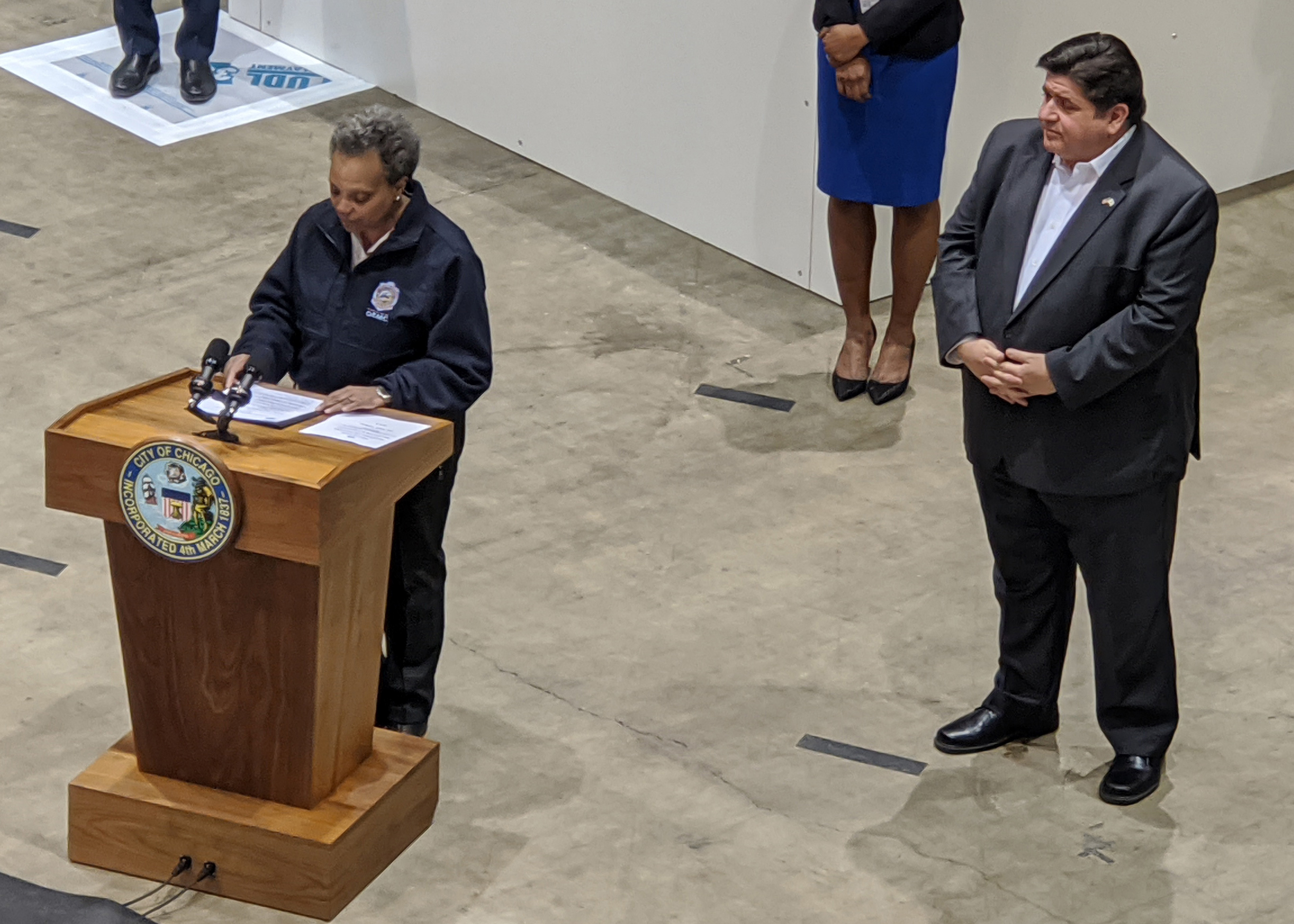
Chicago mayor Lori Lightfoot (left) is accompanied by Pritzker (right) during an April 2020 visit to inspect a temporary hospital facility being erected at Chicago's McCormick Place amid the COVID-19 pandemic.

During the COVID-19 pandemic, Pritzker took several measures to mitigate the pandemic in Illinois. On March 13, 2020, Pritzker declared that public and private schools in Illinois would be closed from March 17 through March 31. On March 15, he announced that all bars and restaurants must close until March 30. Restaurant businesses with delivery and takeout options would still be able to serve. On March 16, 2020, Pritzker issued an executive order limiting permitted crowd sizes to 50 people. Despite pressure from Chicago election officials, he refused to postpone the state's March 17 primary elections, since it was not something that he had the authority to do.

On March 20, 2020, Pritzker issued a stay-at-home order to take effect the next day. Under this order, all non-essential businesses were required to close while essential businesses such as grocery stores, gas stations, hospitals, pharmacies remained open. The order originally ended on April 8. The state government coordinated a public health response. The State of Illinois worked with the U.S. Department of Health and Human Services, Wal-Mart, and Walgreens to provide testing sites in Illinois's hardest-hit communities. By June, amid unrest by some municipalities unhappy with Pritzker's lockdown orders, Mayor Keith Pekau of Orland Park, a suburb southwest of Chicago, and a local restaurateur sued Pritzker in federal court, alleging that the lockdown orders violated state law and the state constitution. U.S. District Judge Andrea Wood ruled against the plaintiffs, allowing the lockdown orders to stay in place. In her ruling, she cited Jacobson v Massachusetts, a 1905 U.S. Supreme Court case that upheld the authority of U.S. states to compel people to get vaccinations.

On March 25, 2020, Pritzker announced the extension of Illinois's tax filing deadline from April 15 to July 15. He also announced three new emergency assistance programs that allowed small businesses to access more than $90 million in aid.

On April 23, 2020, Pritzker extended the stay-at-home order through May 29 with some modifications. Churches were prohibited from holding meetings that had more than 10 people in attendance. Some churches defied Pritzker, held meetings, and filed federal lawsuits. On May 1, 2020, Pritzker enacted a statewide mask mandate.

On May 5, 2020, Pritzker announced his reopening plan, "Restore Illinois". The plan had five phases and split the state's 11 existing Emergency Medical Services Regions into four reopening regions. The regions could reopen independently of one another. All regions were then in Phase Two, which allowed retail curbside pickup and delivery along with outdoor activities such as golf, boating, and fishing. Phase Three would allow manufacturing, offices, retail, barbershops, and salons to reopen with capacity limits, along with gatherings of fewer than 10 people. In Phase Four, gatherings of up to 50 people were allowed, restaurants and bars could reopen, travel resumed, and child care and schools reopened under guidance from the IDPH. In Phase Five, the economy fully reopened. Conventions, festivals and large events were permitted, and all businesses, schools, and places of recreation could be fully open.

On July 15, 2020, Pritzker announced a new COVID-19 mitigation plan in the event of a resurgence of COVID-19. The metrics that would be used to determine whether COVID-19's spread in a region required additional mitigations were a sustained increase in 7-day rolling average (7 out of 10 days) in the positivity rate; and one of the following: a sustained 7-day increase in hospital admissions for a COVID-19 or the reduction in hospital capacity. Another metric was three consecutive days averaging greater than or equal to 8% positivity rate.

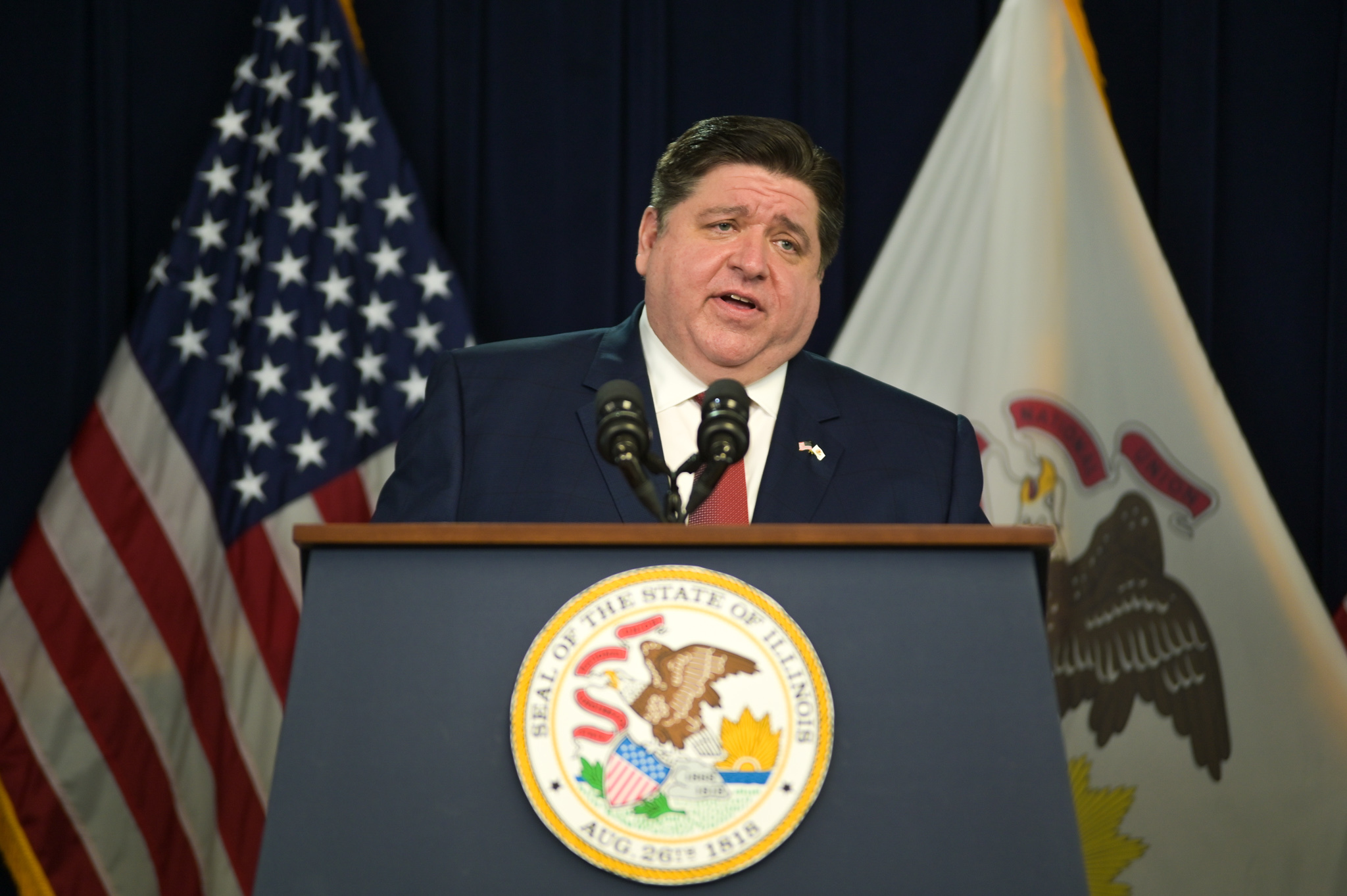
Pritzker announcing the start of operations of a mass-vaccination site on 21 February 2021

On December 4, 2020, Pritzker announced that Illinois would receive 109,000 initial doses of Pfizer's COVID-19 vaccine once the U.S. Food and Drug Administration approved the vaccine.

On February 26, 2021, Pritzker, Cook County Board president Toni Preckwinkle, Chicago mayor Lori Lightfoot, U.S. senators Dick Durbin and Tammy Duckworth, and the Biden administration announced that eligible Illinoisans could get vaccinated starting March 10 at a new mass vaccination site at the United Center.

On July 29, 2021, Pritzker announced that everyone who enters a state building was required to wear a face mask regardless of vaccination status.

On August 5, 2021, Pritzker announced that face masks must be worn at all times while inside P-12 schools, daycares, and long-term care facilities regardless of vaccination status. He also announced that face masks were required for all P-12 indoor sports, and that all state employees in congregate facilities must be vaccinated by October 4.

On August 26, 2021, Pritzker announced that beginning on August 30, a statewide indoor mask mandate would be reimposed to handle the surge caused by the Delta variant. He also announced a vaccine mandate for all education employees in P-12 and higher education statewide and for all higher education students and healthcare workers. Pritzker announced that anyone who did not get a COVID-19 vaccine by September 5 would have to do weekly COVID testing.

On September 19, 2021, Pritzker began imposing a COVID-19 vaccine mandate for college students, educators and most health care workers.

On February 28, 2022, Pritzker lifted most of Illinois's COVID-19 restrictions, including the statewide mask mandate, which came just a few days after the CDC issued new, more relaxed masking guidance.

On July 14, 2022, Pritzker announced the lifting of the COVID-19 vaccine mandate for college students.

=== Criminal justice and law enforcement ===
On April 1, 2019, Pritzker created Illinois's Youth Parole system.

Pritzker signed into law Senate Bill 1890, whose goal is to crack down on human trafficking. It requires hospitality business owners to train their employees to recognize victims of trafficking and to teach them the protocols of reporting to authorities. It also establishes penalties for human trafficking, including a fine of up to $100,000 and a Class 1 Felony charge.

While serving in the Illinois Senate, Barack Obama sponsored an initiative that would collect data on traffic stops. This was codified when Pritzker signed House Bill 1613 into law. It creates a task force to collect and analyze data on traffic stops to address racial disparities. The task force was to report to the governor and the General Assembly by March 1, 2022, and every three years thereafter.

According to the governor's office, the 2019–20 budget funded two classes of Illinois State Police cadets.

In July 2019, Pritzker signed a bill that increases penalties for drivers who got involved in a road incident with injuries while texting. Under this bill, a person who causes serious injuries due to driving while texting could be fined at least $1,000 and have their driver's license suspended for a year. The law took effect immediately. In the same month, he signed House Bill 2045, ending the practice of collecting a $5 copay for offsite medical and dental treatments from people detained at a juvenile correction facility. This took effect in January 2020.

On December 31, 2020, Pritzker announced the expungement of approximately 500,000 non-felony cannabis-related arrest records.

On February 22, 2021, Pritzker signed the SAFE-T Act, a criminal justice reform bill that, among other things, makes Illinois the first U.S. state to eliminate cash bail. The provision was scheduled to go into effect in January 2023, but was put on hold, pending the Illinois Supreme Court's review. In July 2023, the Illinois Supreme Court ruled that the elimination of cash bail was constitutional and would go into effect in September 2023.

=== Energy ===
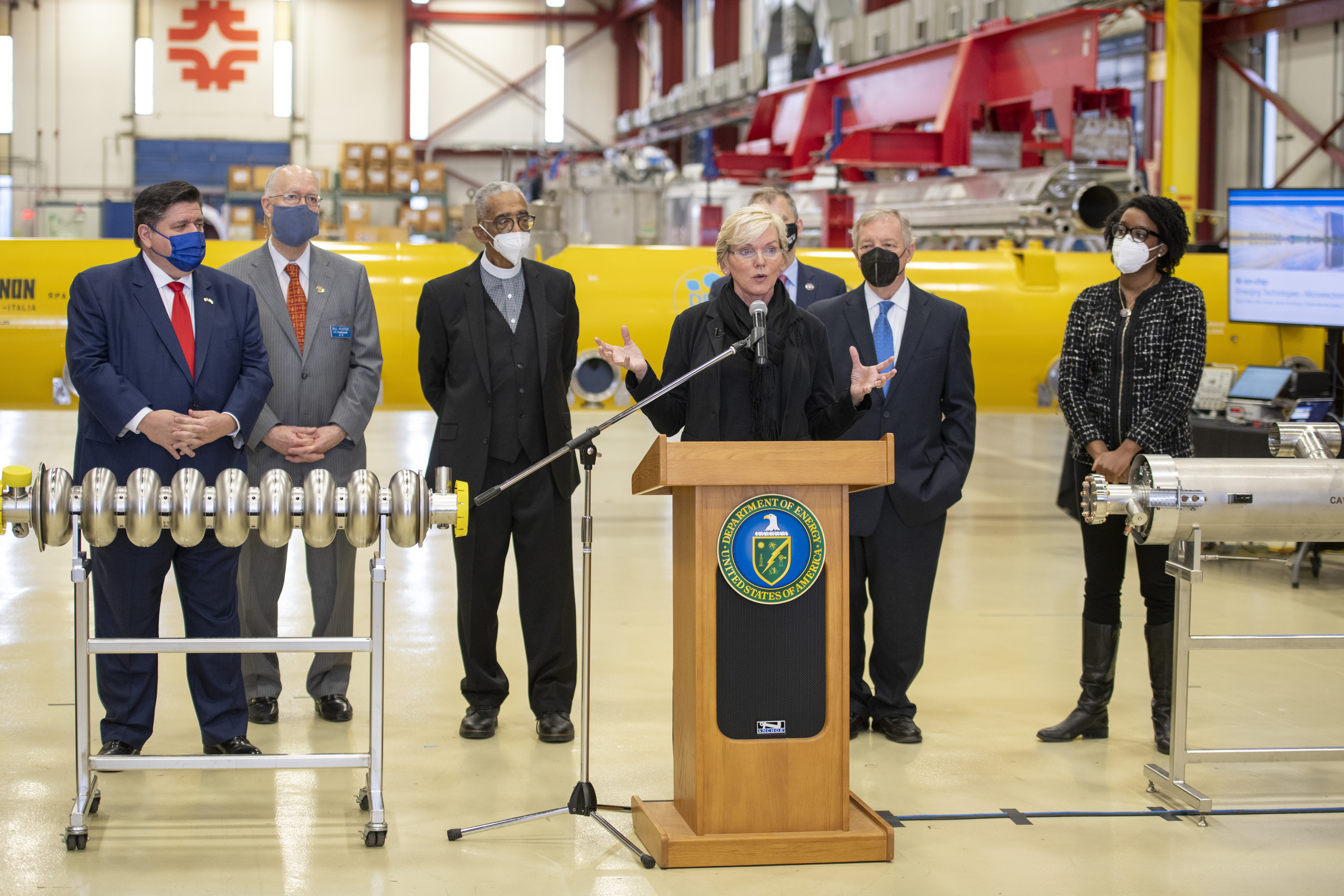
Pritzker with then-U.S. Energy Secretary Jennifer Granholm and other officials at FermiLab in Batavia

In August 2023, Pritzker vetoed legislation to lift a moratorium on nuclear power plant construction in Illinois, citing concerns over nuclear waste. But later that year, he signed into law bipartisan legislation that suspends the moratorium with relation to the deployment of new nuclear capacity through small modular reactors, defined at a maximum capacity of 300 megawatts, and establishes a regulatory structure of the construction of SMRs.

In January 2026, Pritzker signed the Clean and Reliable Grid Affordability Act (CRGA), an energy reform package that lifts the moratorium on nuclear power plant construction, creates incentives for battery storage systems, and introduces "virtual power plants" aimed at harvesting wind and solar energy from homes and businesses to boost the reliability of Illinois's grids. He also signed an executive order directing state agencies to develop a plan, in coordination with local governments, research institutions, developers, and labor organizations, to deploy at least two gigawatts of new nuclear energy capacity, with construction to begin by 2033.

On September 15, 2021, Pritzker signed into law the Climate and Equitable Jobs Act, which directed the Illinois Environmental Protection Agency to establish rebate and grant programs for electric vehicles and charging stations and oversee the phase-out of coal-fired power plants by 2035 and natural gas plants by 2045. It also doubled the state's annual funding for the transition to clean energy sources like solar and wind, with the aim to source 50% of its energy from renewables by 2040. And it created a Carbon Mitigation Credit, funded by a surcharge added to energy bills, to subsidize the operation of nuclear power plants during times when they would ordinarily be unprofitable. The law also requires nuclear power plant operators to send a credit back to ratepayers when demand for nuclear energy, and by extension energy rates, rise, which has given ratepayers a partial break on their monthly payments at various times since the law passed.

=== Environmental issues ===
On January 23, 2019, Pritzker committed Illinois to the United States Climate Alliance, which aimed to reduce the state's greenhouse gas emissions by over 26% by 2025. In 2017, it was revealed that both Pritzker and his 2018 gubernatorial primary opponent Christopher G. Kennedy held stock in ExxonMobil, Chevron Corporation, Occidental Petroleum, and ConocoPhillips.

In 2024, Pritzker signed the SAFE CCS Act, making Illinois the second state after California to halt approval of carbon dioxide pipelines.

=== Ethics ===
In April 2026, Pritzker signed an executive order barring state employees from betting on prediction markets like Kalshi or Polymarket while aided by nonpublic information acquired from their jobs.

=== Gambling ===
To help pay for his 2019 capital spending bill, Pritzker expanded gambling, allowing more casinos and legalized sports betting. This did not mean new casinos could be built and sports betting could begin right away: granting licenses for such activities is the job of the Illinois Gaming Board, and the process is a complex one, lasting several months or more and involving extensive criminal background checks, among other requirements. According to the governor's office, gambling will bring an additional $350 million in revenue each year. This gambling expansion bill extends to Chicago, something the city wanted. Chicago mayor Lori Lightfoot emphasized economic development in the city's South and West sides during her campaign. She has argued that a new casino, privately owned, and associated hospitality and entertainment venues will bring money into the city.

On May 5, 2022, Lightfoot announced that she had selected Bally's Corporation's bid to construct a casino resort near the Chicago River.

=== Gun control ===
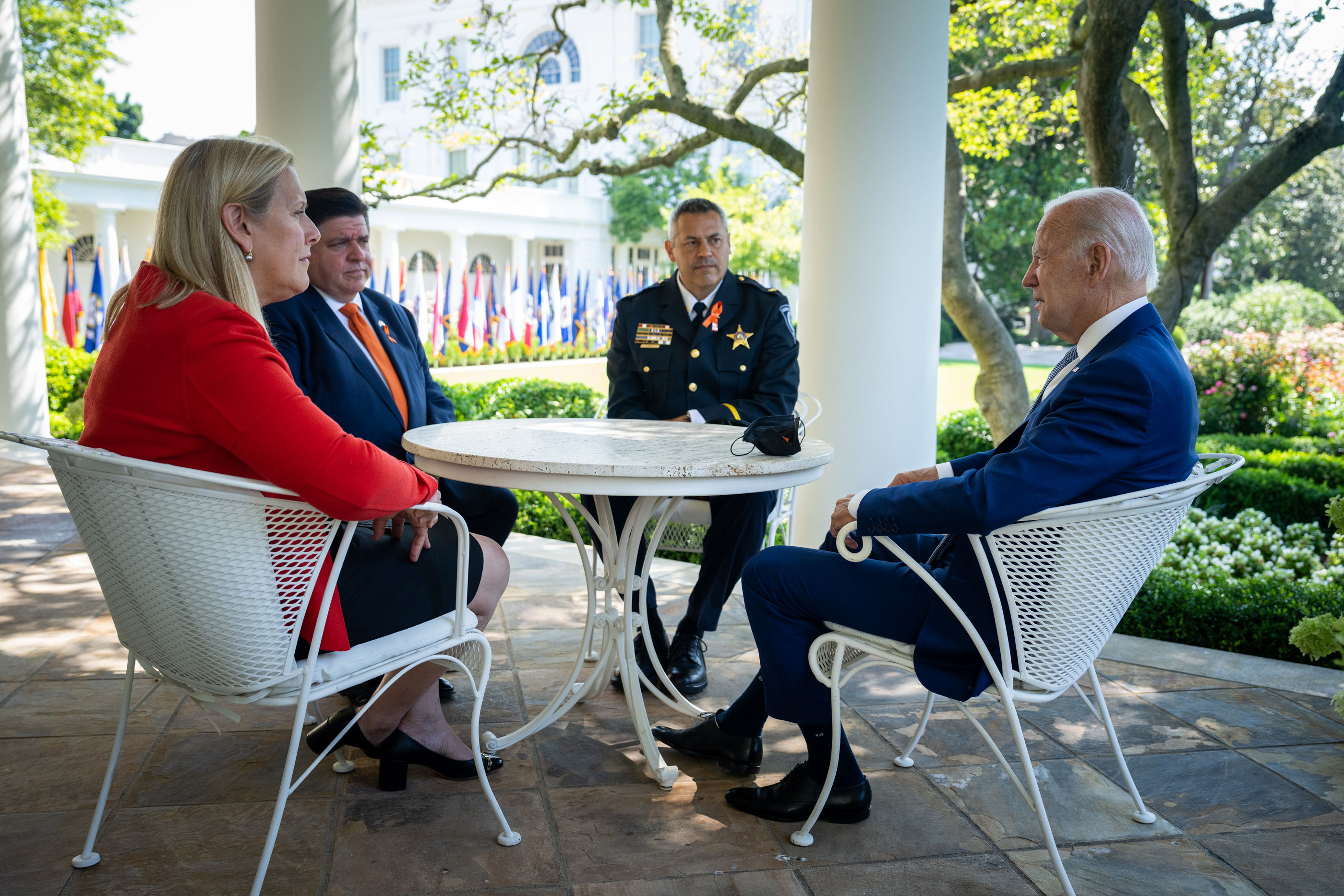
Pritzker meeting with President Biden following the Highland Park shooting, in July 2022

On January 17, 2019, Pritzker signed a bill requiring state certification for gun dealers, which passed during the tenure of his predecessor, Bruce Rauner. It also requires gun dealers to ensure the physical security of their stores, to keep a detailed list of items on sale, and employees of such stores to undergo annual training. These requirements come on top of the mandatory federal license issued by the Bureau of Alcohol, Tobacco, Firearms and Explosives. Proponents say Senate Bill 337 prevents guns from falling "into the wrong hands" while opponents argue it creates additional bureaucracy, imposes a financial burden on gun business owners, and will neither enhance public safety nor reduce crime. The Illinois State Rifle Association argued that the bill violates the Second Amendment to the U.S. Constitution because it interferes with the right to bear arms, and filed a lawsuit alongside eight gun dealers.

On May 18, 2022, Pritzker signed House Bill 4383, which banned the sale and possession of homemade firearms in Illinois. Illinois became the 11th state and first midwestern state to enact such a policy.

On January 11, 2023, Pritzker signed a ban on assault weapons and high-capacity magazines. He said of the legislation, "With this legislation we are delivering on the promises Democrats have made and, together, we are making Illinois's gun laws a model for the nation." The new law took effect immediately, with approximately 2.5 million Illinois gun owners affected. Gun rights organizations pledged to challenge the law in court, saying, "Almost the entire bill is a constitutional issue", according to the Illinois State Rifle Association. An Effingham County judge issued a temporary injunction preventing implementation of the law on January 20, 2023. The Illinois Supreme Court ruled the law constitutional and allowed it to take effect. Lawsuits are also pending in federal court and in Crawford County.

=== Health care ===
In 2019, Pritzker approved a tax on private insurance to help fund the state's Medicaid program. In August of that year, he signed legislation to eliminate the state's backlog of Medicaid applications, which as of March 15, 2019, included 112,000 that remained unprocessed past the federal 45-day limit. According to data from the Illinois Department of Human Services, the backlog was eliminated as of June 2020.

In August 2023, under provisions of Illinois House Bill 2189 (the Access to Afford Insulin Act), Pritzker signed legislation capping insurance holders' out-of-pocket price of insulin at $35 for a 30-day supply. In July 2024, Pritzker signed bills allowing Illinois to spend $10 million to purchase medical debt from creditors, known as the Medical Debt Relief Pilot Program, under the Illinois Department of Healthcare and Family Services. The program was created to eliminate nearly $1 billion in medical debt for 340,000 low-income state residents. In October 2026, Pritzker announced that approximately 700,000 Illinoisans' medical debt, totaling $1.4 billion, had been erased under the program, at a cost to the state of less than $10 million.

On April 22, 2025, United States Secretary of Health and Human Services Robert F. Kennedy Jr. announced a plan to use government data to help determine the causes of autism. In response, Pritzker signed an executive order that made Illinois the first state to block the federal government from collecting personal health data related to autism.

In 2025, Pritzker signed Illinois House Bill 1697, the Prescription Drug Affordability Act. The bill passed by a bipartisan vote and prohibits pharmacy benefit managers from sending customers to pharmacies they have a financial interest in and from charging health insurance plans a higher price for a drug than what the pharmacy benefit managers pay the pharmacy.

=== Housing ===
In 2026, Pritzker proposed the "Building Up Illinois Developments" (BUILD) plan for approval by the Illinois General Assembly to amend the fiscal year 2027 state budget, which involves amending the Illinois Municipal Code to relax zoning restrictions, permit greater volume of single-family housing units on lots, legalize the construction accessory dwelling units—granny flats, backyard cottages and above-garage apartments—on residential properties, and prohibit the enactment of minimum parking requirements for certain types of residential and mixed-use housing typically set by municipal governments, in order to spur housing construction and development to reduce costs and meet the state's housing supply needs. The plan also prevents building codes from prohibiting the construction of single-stair residential suites. On February 19, 2026, Representative Kam Buckner introduced the plan in the Illinois House of Representatives as HB5626.

Accordingly, Pritzker's administration also authorized the Illinois Housing Development Authority to provide down-payment assistance through the IDHAccess Home program, calculated at 6% of the purchase price up to $15,000, for qualified, low- to middle-income homebuyers who do not own a home or have not owned one in the preceding three years, as well as veterans.

=== Immigration ===
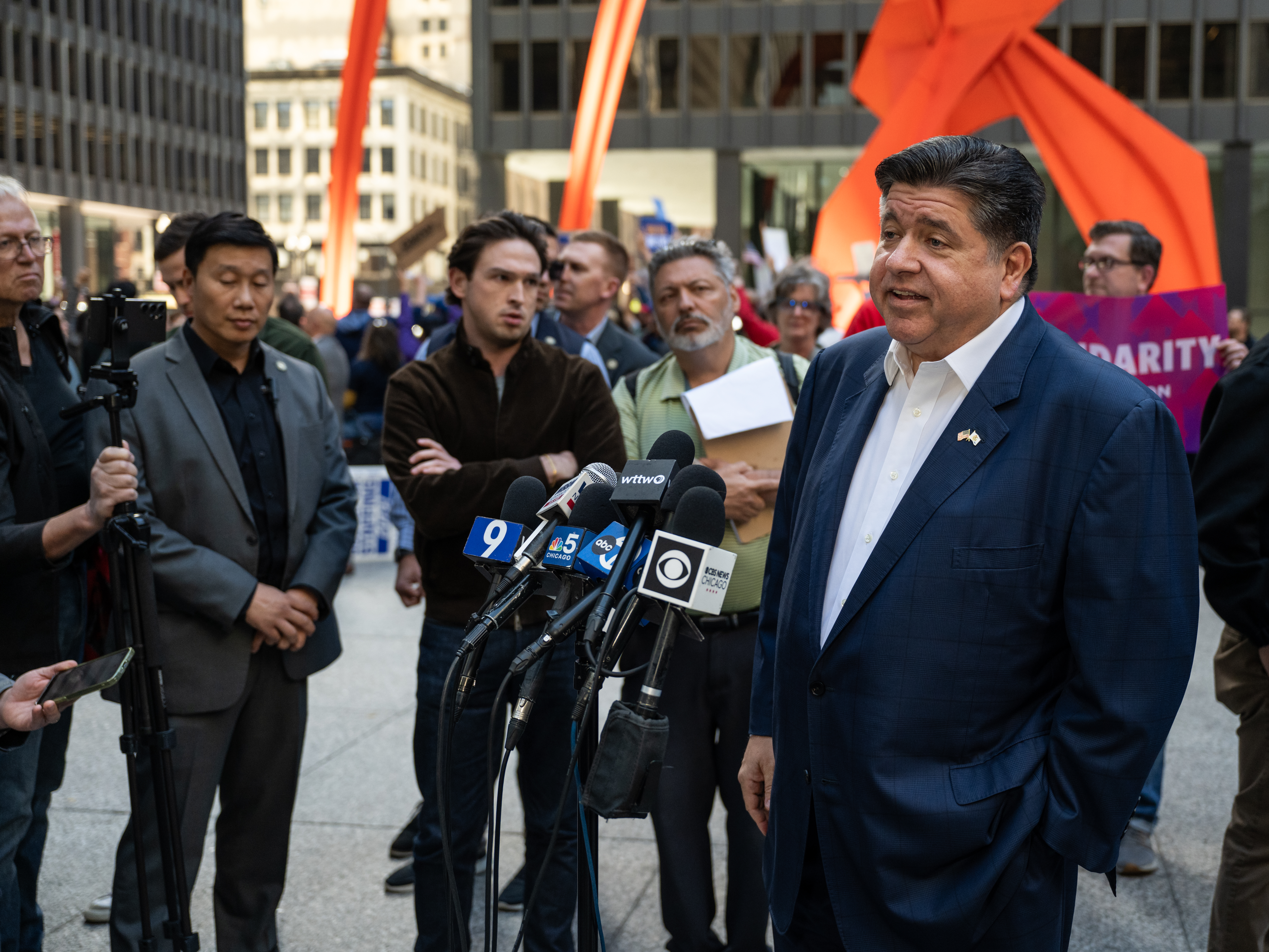
Pritzker attends a protest against ICE activities in the Chicago area as part of Operation Midway Blitz.

In 2017, Pritzker protested at O'Hare International Airport against President Donald Trump's Executive Order 13769, commonly called the "Muslim travel ban" to the United States.

On January 24, 2019, Pritzker signed an executive order expanding access to Illinois welcome centers for immigrants and refugees. Welcome centers help guide immigrants on a path to citizenship and refugees with access to health care, education, jobs, and legal services.

On June 21, 2019, Pritzker signed a bill banning the operation of private immigration detention centers in Illinois. Another bill forbids state and local police to cooperate with U.S. Immigration Customs and Enforcement (ICE) to deport illegal immigrants. College students who are undocumented immigrants or identify as transgender may apply for state financial aid for college. (Federal aid requires proof of citizenship and those who were assigned male at birth to register for the draft.)

Pritzker erased the drug conviction of an Army veteran in August 2019. Miguel Perez Jr. suffered a brain injury while serving in Afghanistan and was diagnosed with post-traumatic stress disorder. He was deported to Mexico in 2018 after spending seven years in prison. He had pleaded guilty to a drug crime and held a green card as a permanent U.S. resident. Perez's supporters hope the pardon will help him return to the U.S.

On June 12, 2025, Pritzker testified in front of Congress during a hearing examining Chicago's immigration policies. He said he supported "bipartisan comprehensive immigration reform", which he had called for during his 2018 gubernatorial campaign. Pritzker also said he supported the deportation of undocumented immigrants who had been convicted of violent crimes, saying, "violent criminals have no place on our streets; if they are undocumented, we want them out of Illinois and out of our country".

In 2025, Pritzker spoke out against the Trump administration's Operation Midway Blitz, an operation cracking down on undocumented immigrants in Chicago. He said the operation was targeting law-abiding minority Chicagoans and not cooperating with local authorities.

=== Infrastructure ===
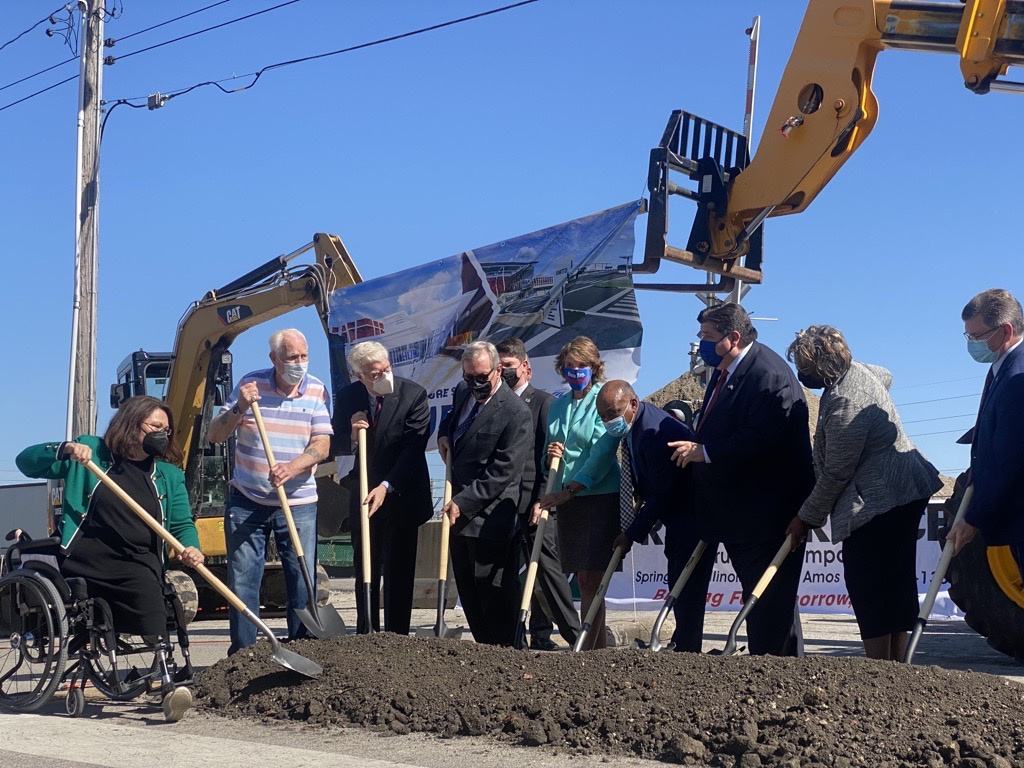
Pritzker at the groundbreaking of the Springfield-Sangamon Transportation Center

In late June 2019, Pritzker signed the bipartisan capital bill named Rebuild Illinois, worth $45 billion to be spent in six years and estimated to create 540,000 jobs. It was the first capital-spending bill in Illinois in ten years. The plan includes $33.2 billion for transportation projects, including $25 billion for road upgrades, with local governments deciding which roads they want to prioritize; $3.5 billion for public and private schools and universities; $1 billion for environmental protection; $420 million for expanding broadband Internet service to rural Illinois; $465 million for health care and human services facilities; and $1.8 billion for libraries, museums, and minority-owned businesses. Financing for this plan will come from multiple sources. The gas tax was set to match inflation since the last gas-tax increase in 1990, increasing from 19 cents per gallon to 38 cents; the special fuel tax on diesel, liquefied natural gas, and propane increased to 7.5 cents per gallon. Fuel taxes will be indexed to inflation. Vehicle registration fees increased by $50. The state's bonding authority will increase from $22.6 billion to $60.8 billion. Newly authorized casinos are expected to create thousands of jobs and deliver hundreds of millions of dollars in tax revenue for construction projects. Cook County municipalities may raise their own gas taxes by up to three cents per gallon, though Chicago mayor Lori Lightfoot said she opposed raising the gas tax in her city and increasing Chicago Transit Authority fares. The capital bill also stipulates the creation of an apprenticeship program in the construction industry to provide part of the labor force necessary.

Transportation spending includes money for mass transit and pedestrian paths, with hundreds of millions going to projects involving Chicago. Some major projects are the reconstruction and capacity enhancement of the Kennedy Expressway ($561 million), expanding a train service between Chicago and Rockford ($275 million), and upgrades for the Pace suburban bus service ($220 million). Millions of dollars will be spent on improving the Chicago–St. Louis higher-speed railway, and moving passenger and rail traffic in Springfield to one set of tracks, eliminating a physical barrier.

As justification for the multi-billion-dollar spending bill and the accompanying tax hikes, Pritzker said that Illinois had not had a major infrastructure plan for two decades and asserted that improved infrastructure would help drivers on repairs.

By 2026, the Rebuild Illinois program had administered $25.6 billion in roadway investments, financing the improvement or expansion of 9,058 route-miles—and over 24,000 lane-miles—of highway and roads, more than 900 bridges, and 1,475 other safety improvements, from routine maintenance projects and minor resurfacings to extensive interstate and bridge reconstructions.

In October 2025, Pritzker and the Illinois Department of Transportation announced a proposed six-year Highway & Multimodal Multi-Year Improvement Program, slated to begin in fiscal year 2026, involving the leveraging of $50.6 billion in public funds to invest $32.5 billion into more than 7,100 miles of state and local roads and 8.4 million square feet of bridge deck, $13.8 billion distributed across 90 transit projects, $2.9 billion for 29 freight and passenger rail projects, $1.2 billion for 244 aviation projects, and $200 million for ports and waterways, including 28 marine projects. The plan includes $388 million for the proposed Quad Cities Amtrak route between Chicago and Moline, Illinois and $400 million to replace the I-80 bridge that connects LeClaire, Iowa, and Rapids City, Illinois.

In June 2019, Pritzker deployed 200 Illinois National Guardsmen to combat flooding across central and southern Illinois. The troops were tasked with sandbagging, protecting levees and keeping evacuation routes open. In August 2019, he officially requested a federal disaster declaration for 32 Illinois counties due to flooding since February 2019. The request came after the state's disaster assessment was concluded.

=== Labor ===
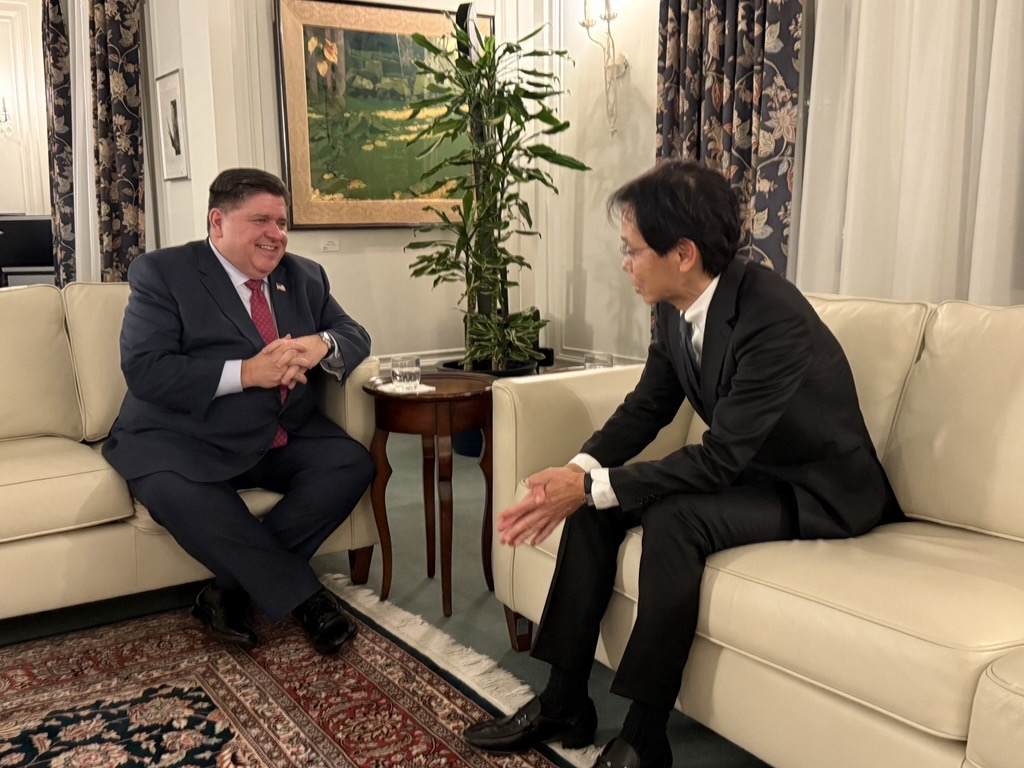
Pritzker meeting with Japanese Consul-General Jun Yanagi in January 2025 after a trade mission to Japan

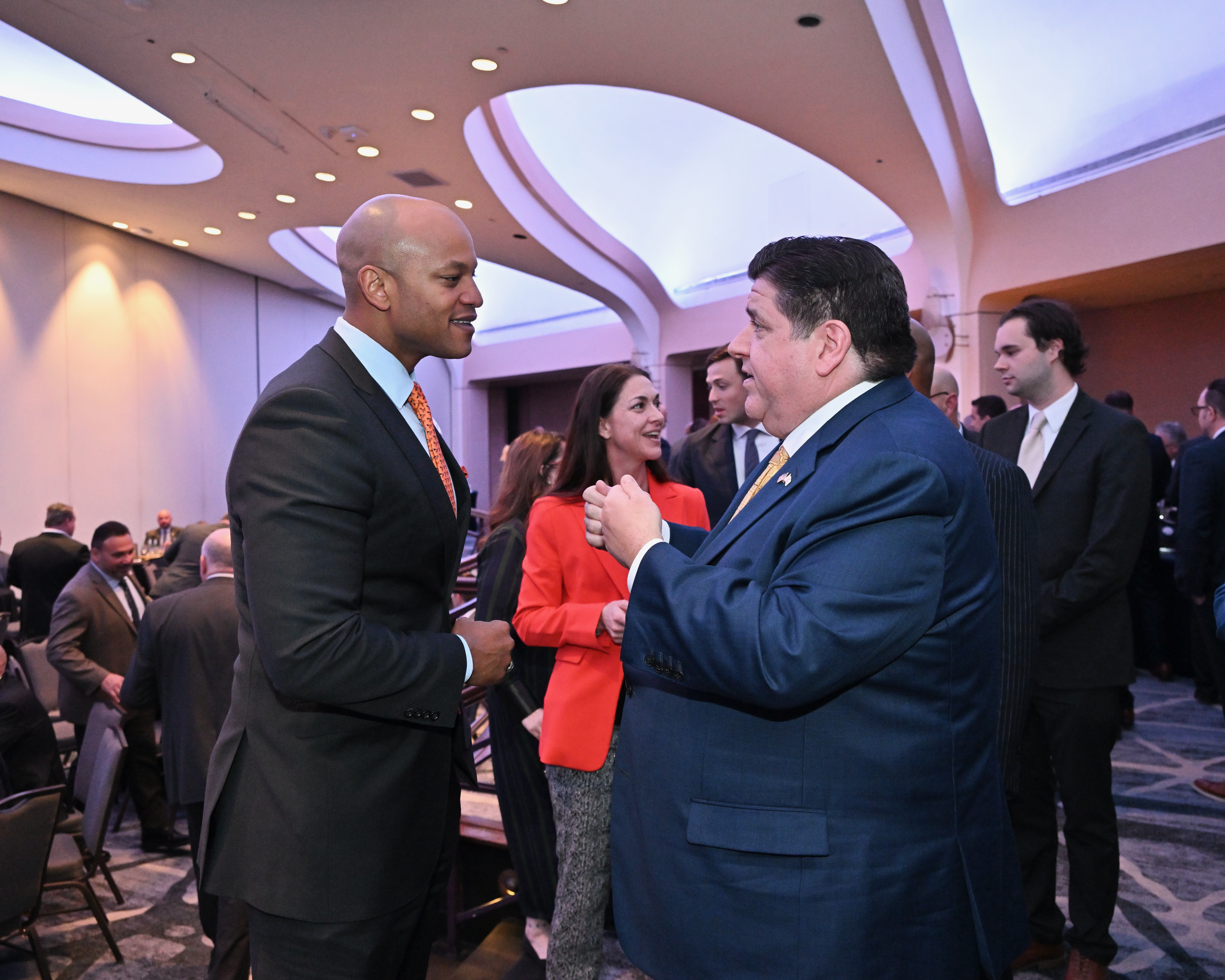
Pritzker with Maryland Governor Wes Moore in April 2023

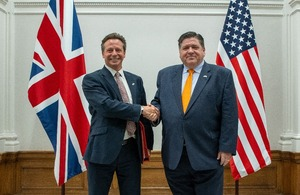
Pritzker with U.K. Minister of State for International Trade Nigel Huddleston in 2023

On February 19, 2019, Pritzker signed into law a bill that raises the state minimum wage to $15 an hour by 2025, making Illinois the fifth state in the nation and first state in the Midwest to do so. The bill includes a tax credit for small businesses to help them deal with higher costs of labor and maintains the ability of restaurant owners to count tips toward pay.

On April 12, 2019, Pritzker signed the Collective Bargaining Freedom Act, which protects the right of employers, employees, and their labor organizations to collectively bargain, ensuring that Illinois complies with the National Labor Relations Act. On May 17, 2019, Pritzker signed legislation to help workers exposed to toxic substances.

In July 2019, Pritzker signed House Bill 2028, which passed both the Senate and House of Illinois unanimously. This bill doubles the compensation rate for families of police officers and firefighters killed in the line of duty from $10,000 to $20,000.

On March 13, 2023, Pritzker signed the Paid Leave for All Workers Act, which requires employers to give employees at least an hour of paid leave for every 40 hours of work, up to 40 hours per year, which employees can use for any reason. It went into effect in 2024.

On July 31, 2024, Pritzker signed the Worker Freedom of Speech Act, which sought to curtail the practice of the administration of captive audience meetings by employers, which is a tactic used to discourage employees from organizing, or joining or forming a labor union.

In response to shifts in federal policy in the transition between the Biden and Trump administrations, Pritzker signed a number of bills codifying federal labor protections into state law: the Illinois Workers' Rights and Safety Act, which preserves regulations defined by the Occupational Safety and Health Act of 1970, the Fair Labor Standards Act of 1938, and the Federal Coal Mine Health and Safety Act of 1969, regardless of any changes at the federal level; an amendment to the Prevailing Wage Act that ensures that workers for federally funded construction projects administered by the state or local governments are paid the Illinois prevailing wage whenever it is higher than the federal rate; and a bill eliminating references to the Equal Pay Act of 1963 that would have tied some provisions to federal programs, so that federal changes will not undermine the state's requirement that employers with 100 or more employees report on wages by employees' gender and race or ethnicity.

=== LGBTQ rights ===
In June 2019, Pritzker signed an executive order requiring schools across the state to be "affirming and inclusive" of transgender and non-binary students. He also asked the State Board of Education to take a lead on LGBTQ rights by making relevant resources easily accessible.

=== Taxation ===
On the same day as the 2019–20 state budget, Pritzker signed the "Fair Tax" law, which offered a constitutional amendment to voters in the November 2020 election to replace Illinois's flat tax with graduated rates. He promised that income taxes would not increase for Illinoisans who make $250,000 a year or less, who are 97% of the state's wage earners. Pritzker and his supporters said changing income tax laws was the first step toward comprehensive state tax reform.

According to the governor's office, under this proposal, families and couples would see tax cuts across the board. For example, a family of four making $61,000 a year would pay $41 less in income tax before any other tax exemptions or deductions. Moreover, there would be a tax credit of up to $100 per child for individuals making less than $80,000 and joint filers earning under $100,000. The corporate tax rate would rise from 7% to 7.95%, equal to the highest personal rate. In addition, Pritzker wanted to increase the property tax credit to 6% from 5%.

Pritzker donated more than $55 million to "Vote Yes for Fairness", a committee that supported the tax change. The tax change set up a fight between Pritzker and Ken Griffin, who donated over $50 million to a group opposing it. Griffin called Pritzker "spineless", accusing him of trying "to sell a trick disguised as a solution", and pointed to Pritzker's offshore trusts and personal tax avoidance schemes as hypocritical.

Pritzker claimed that his income tax proposal would bring $3.4 billion in tax revenue. As of 2019, Illinois had $8.5 billion of unpaid bills and $134 billion of pension liabilities.

The gas tax that funds the 2019 infrastructure plan, 38 cents per gallon and indexed to inflation, took effect on July 1, 2019. As of 2019, Illinois had one of the highest fuel taxes in the U.S.

In 2024, Pritzker signed legislation eliminating the state's 1% tax on groceries, beginning January 1, 2026. In 2024, Pritzker signed a budget into law that included the creation of the state's first child tax credit, which provided up to $300 to households with children under 12 years old that made less than $60,000 annually. In 2025, the tax credit doubled to up to $600 per child. In October 2026, Pritzker announced that 405,000 Illinois families had claimed the tax credit in 2025, for a total of $134 million.

=== Tobacco ===
On April 7, 2019, Pritzker made Illinois the first state in the Midwest to adopt Tobacco 21.

As part of his plan to fund capital projects, Pritzker raised the sales tax on cigarettes by $1.

=== Transit ===
On December 16, 2025, Pritzker signed into law the Illinois People Over Parking Act, which disburses $1.5 billion to address post-COVID-19 budget shortfalls for Chicagoland-area transit authorities to avoid service cuts; reduces the farebox revenue share of total funding from 50% to 25%, since post-pandemic reductions in ridership made these expectations unreasonable; and disburses $169 million to downstate transit agencies to cover similar budget shortfalls. It prevents transit agencies from transferring funding for operations to capital investment. Local jurisdictions are prohibited from establishing minimum parking requirements within half a mile of transit rail stations and bus hubs or one-eighth mile of corridors with combined bus route frequency of 15 minutes or less during peak periods under this legislation.

The bill also reorganizes the Regional Transportation Authority into the Northern Illinois Transit Authority, which is intended to centralize decision-making power away from individual counties and synchronize operations of the Chicago Transit Authority, Metra, and Pace. The NITA board is to have 20 members, five assigned by the mayor of Chicago, the Cook County President, and the governor, and five by the five collar counties, where 15 votes are needed to affirm board actions, or 12 if two affirmative votes from each of the four appointing authorities are cast; and a majority of CTA, Metra, and Pace board members are to be simultaneously staffed by NITA board members. It requires the creation of a unified fare system for Chicago-area bus and train services, and has the authority to centrally plan capital projects, manage budgeting, plan regional transit, develop land it owns near stations, and generate revenue. It also has a mandate to promote transit-oriented development.

Elected officials can no longer serve as board members under the bill, which some say impedes the functioning of transit boards.

=== Public employee pensions ===
Pritzker refused to take on the City of Chicago's pension liabilities, believing that would jeopardize Illinois's credit rating. Moody's raised it to one level above "junk" after Illinois passed a balanced budget in 2019. But Pritzker did not reject the possibility of allowing Chicago to pool its pension funds with other parts of the state, and created a task force to find ways to tackle municipalities' ballooning pension debts. Pension funds in Illinois are collectively funded at only 47.8%.

=== Voting rights ===
In June 2020, Pritzker signed legislation to expand voting by making Election Day a state holiday.

=== Welfare ===
The 2019–20 budget spent $230 million on a new Quincy Veterans Home, and $21 million on the Chicago Veterans Home.

In July 2019, Pritzker signed House Bill 3343, creating a food program for the elderly, the disabled, and the homeless. Such individuals may collect their benefits from a private business that has a contract with the Illinois Department of Human Services (IDHS) to provide meals with discounts. This is the state implementation of the federal Supplemental Nutrition Assistance Program (SNAP). The IDHS was to initiate this program no later than January 1, 2020.

On July 12, 2026, Pritzker signed House Bill 4456, which expands eligibility for the federal Low-Income Home Energy Assistance Program to households with an annual income below 300% of the federal poverty line, up from 200%. Later that month, his administration announced the Families Receiving Emergency Support for Hunger program, under which the state government would disperse $400 in nutritional assistance to each of over 100,000 people who were kicked off of SNAP between May and July 2026 due to changes to program eligibility administered by the One Big Beautiful Bill Act.

=== National profile and political future ===
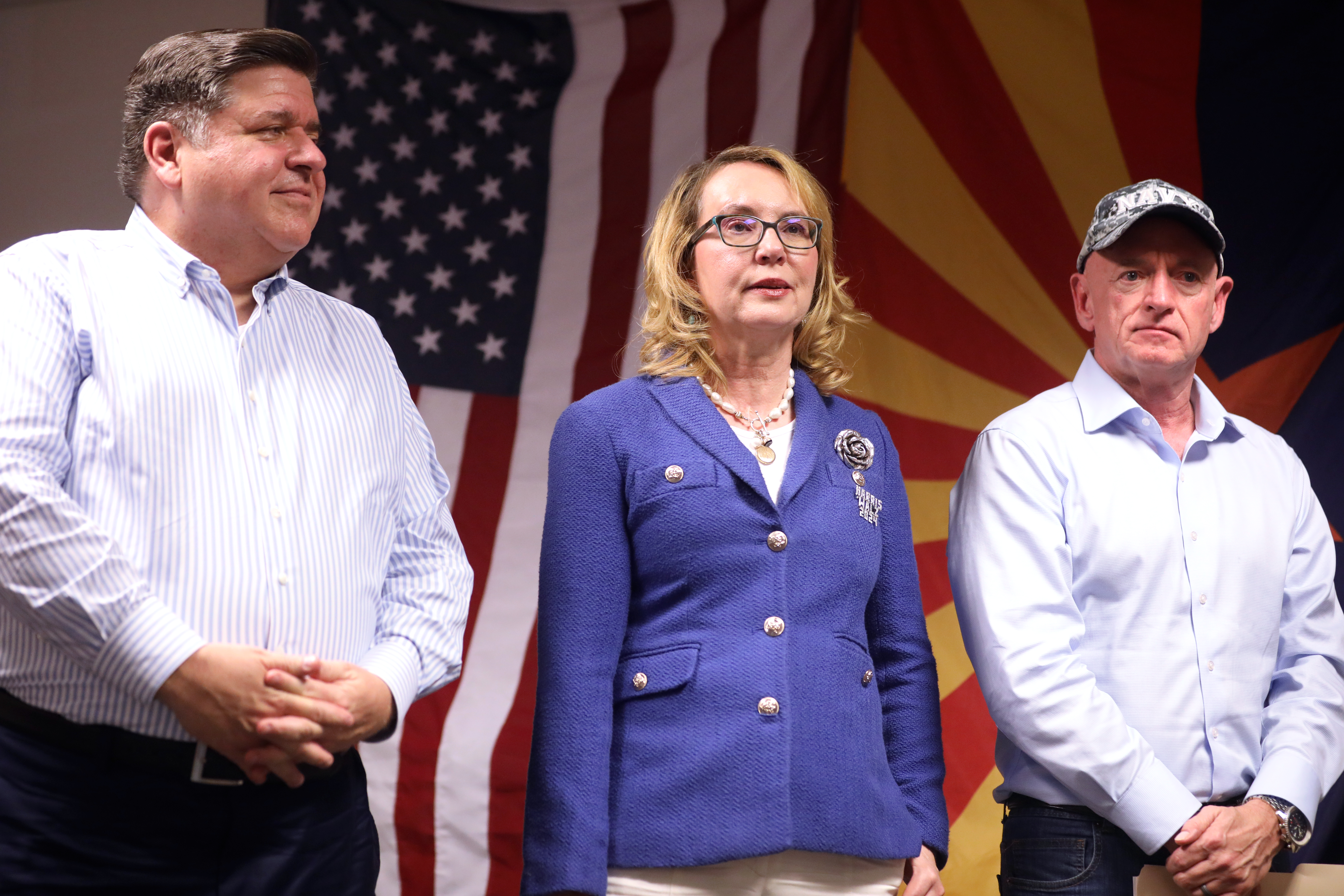
Pritzker stumping for Kamala Harris's 2024 presidential campaign with U.S. Senator Mark Kelly and former U.S. Representative Gabby Giffords

Pritzker is seeking a third term as governor of Illinois in 2026. He is viewed as a potential Democratic contender for president of the United States, according to NBC News and The Wall Street Journal. He has declined to rule out a presidential run in 2028.

== Political positions ==
=== Abortion ===
Pritzker speaking at a Planned Parenthood event in 2021

Pritzker is pro-choice and a vocal supporter of abortion rights. During the 2018 gubernatorial Democratic primaries, Planned Parenthood supported Pritzker, along with Kennedy and Biss.

On January 22, 2019, Pritzker signed an executive order giving state employees and women covered under Illinois state health insurance expanded reproductive coverage, including abortion. Planned Parenthood officials praised the move and attended the signing event.

In October 2023, Pritzker launched and funded the abortion rights nonprofit Think Big America, which targets ballot measures in other states as part of a broader campaign "combating far-right extremism".

=== Alliance of governors ===
In November 2024, Pritzker and other U.S. state governors established Governors Safeguarding Democracy, an alliance to protect state interests against anticipated changes in the federal government.

=== Cannabis ===
Pritzker supports expanding Illinois's medical marijuana program and legalizing recreational cannabis in Illinois. In 2019, he signed into law the Illinois Cannabis Regulation and Tax Act, which effectively legalized the possession and regulated sale of marijuana for recreational purposes starting in 2020.

=== Education ===
In 2021, Pritzker signed legislation transitioning the Chicago Board of Education from an unelected seven-member board to a 21-member elected board by 2027, ending mayoral control of the board that had been in place since 1872.

In 2023, Pritzker introduced the "Smart Start Illinois" initiative to expand preschool access, although progress was slow as of 2026.

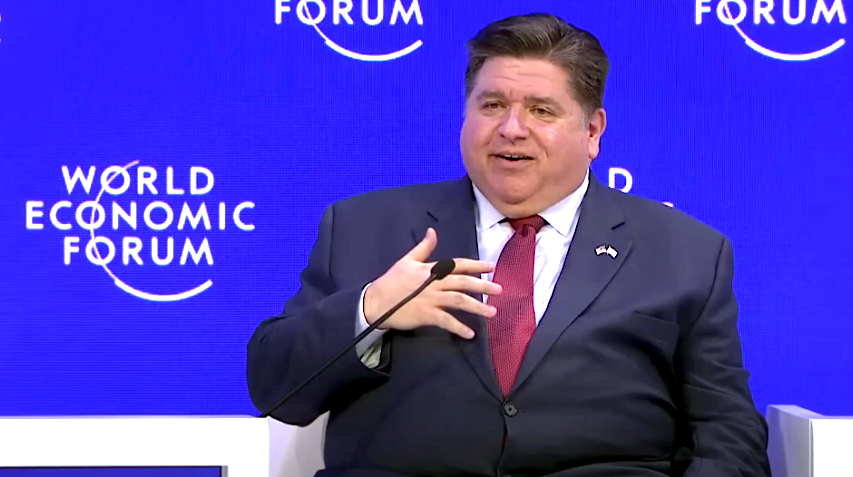
Pritzker speaking at the World Economic Forum in 2023

=== Gun control ===
In response to the 2022 Highland Park parade shooting, in 2023 Pritzker signed legislation to ban assault weapons and introduce universal background checks in Illinois. It also mandated the registration of currently owned assault weapons with the state police.

=== Healthcare ===
Pritzker has called for Congress to "pass measures to provide universal healthcare". In 2024, Pritzker proposed the Illinois Medical Debt Relief program. After approval by the legislature, the State of Illinois partnered with the private nonprofit Undue Medical Debt to buy and forgive medical debt for Illinois residents making up to 400% of the federal poverty level. By October 2026, the program had been expanded and over $1.4 billion of medical debt had been relieved.

=== Immigration ===
Pritzker supports Syrian refugees, and criticized the first Trump administration and Rauner for "turning a blind eye on them". He also supports enhancing funding for immigrant and refugee services, increasing health care options for undocumented immigrants, improving the U-Visa certification process for victims of violent crimes, and providing access to financial aid for undocumented students such as DACA recipients. He has said he would sign the "Illinois Trust Act", a pro-immigration bill.

In January 2025, when asked about the mass deportation of illegal immigrants in the second presidency of Donald Trump, Pritzker spoke in favor of deporting convicted criminals who are undocumented, but criticized the targeting of "law-abiding residents" who are integrated into communities.

=== Israel and Palestine ===
In August 2024, The Times of Israel reported that Pritzker previously served on the national board of the pro-Israel lobby group AIPAC. In March 2026, Pritzker clarified to The New York Times that while he had donated to AIPAC, he had not served on its board. In 2026, he was described as a "former supporter" of the group and his spokesperson said he had not donated to AIPAC in a decade and believed the group had "abandoned its bipartisan principles and become a pro-Trump organization".

After the October 7 attacks on Israel in 2023, Pritzker issued a public condemnation of the attacks, saying that Illinois "unequivocally stands" with the Israeli people and that Hamas is a terrorist organization while acknowledging that "There are many peace-loving Palestinians" in Gaza.

In February 2024, Pritzker criticized the Gaza ceasefire resolution passed by Chicago Mayor Brandon Johnson and rejected calls for an immediate permanent ceasefire in the Gaza war, arguing that a lasting ceasefire was not possible while Hamas retained the ability to attack Israel. In October 2024, he publicly supported a ceasefire, saying, "It's past time to honor the innocent Palestinian and Israeli lives lost by securing the release of the hostages and implementing a ceasefire" in a statement on social media. In June 2025, Pritzker said the question of whether what is happening in Gaza is a genocide was for others to determine in accordance with the term's definition.

In August 2025, Pritzker supported Senator Bernie Sanders's push to block arms sales to Israel, saying it would send Israel "the right kind of message".

=== LGBTQ rights ===
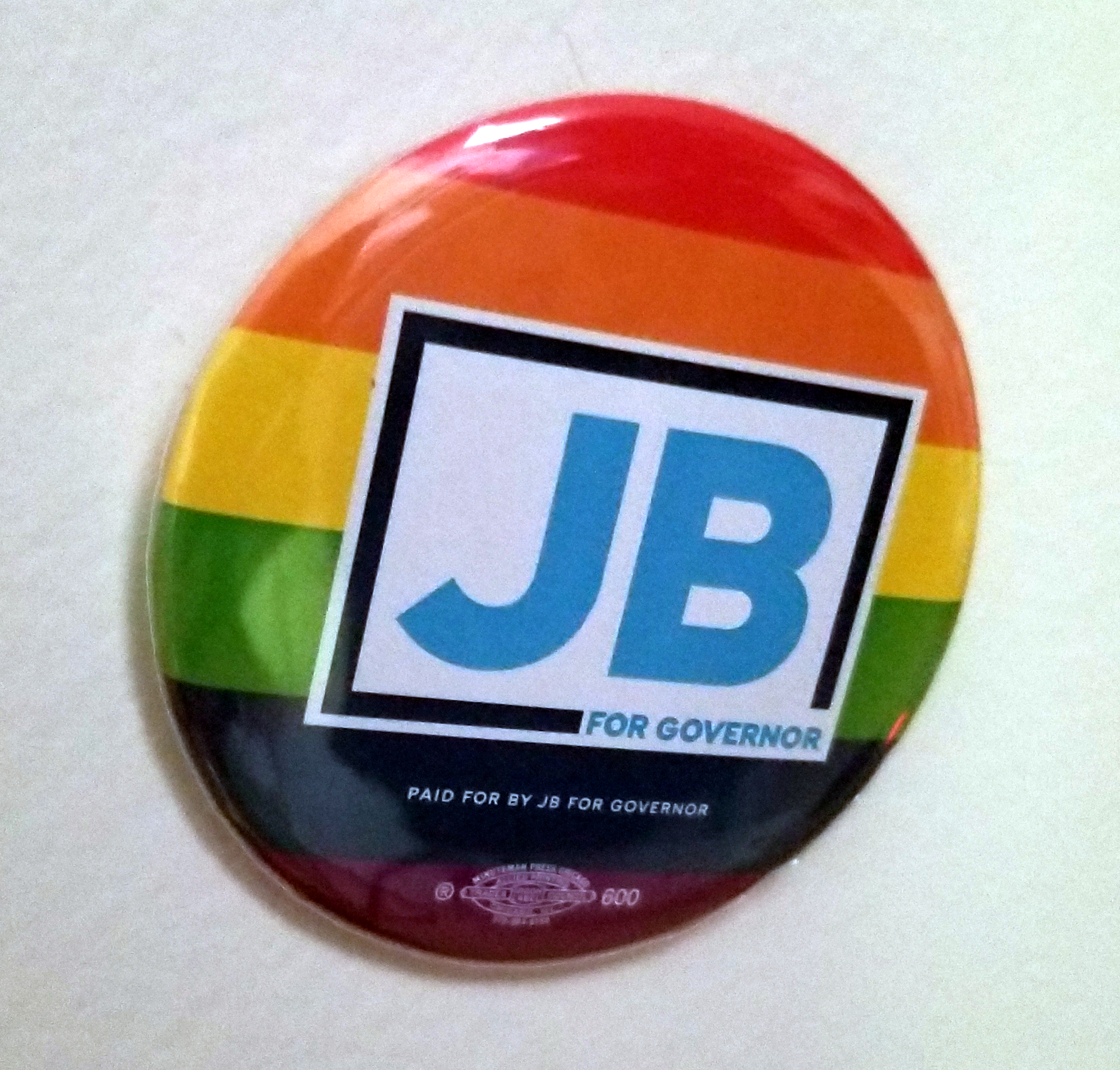
Rainbow background of a LGBTQ campaign button from 2018

Pritzker has been a longtime advocate of LGBTQ rights, and has actively participated in the Chicago Gay Pride Parade. As part of his 2018 gubernatorial race, he said his administration would address anti-LGBTQ hate crimes, expand LGBTQ access to health care, and oppose any anti-LGBTQ legislation.

=== Minimum wage ===
As a candidate for governor, Pritzker campaigned on raising the minimum wage in Illinois to $15 an hour. He enacted a plan to do so, raising the minimum wage to $9.25 an hour on January 1, 2020, and then to $10 an hour on July 1 of that year. The minimum wage has risen by $1 per hour each year every year until January 1, 2025, when it reached its expected goal of $15 an hour.

=== Net neutrality ===
Pritzker supports net neutrality, and wrote on his gubernatorial campaign website: "As governor, I will ensure that all internet traffic is treated equally, so that everyone can continue to use the internet to grow their businesses, further their education, and enjoy the freedom of expression."

== Public image ==
=== Supporters ===
Pritzker has gained support from progressives and socialists for his stances on healthcare, education, raising the minimum wage, legalizing recreational marijuana, and expanding access to healthcare. His administration has been considered one of the most progressive in the United States.

=== Opposition ===
The vast majority of opposition to Pritzker comes from Republicans and conservatives, who oppose his views on gun restrictions and abortion. Pritzker's gubernatorial election results in Southern Illinois were less successful than those of Rod Blagojevich or Glenn Poshard. Some left-wing activists have also criticized Pritzker for his unclear stance on Medicare for All and lack of action on minority issues.

Pritzker's opponents have pointed to the deposition of former U.S. President Bill Clinton before the House Oversight Committee in March 2026. During the deposition, Clinton implied that Pritzker and his wife flew on Jeffrey Epstein's plane with him. In response to the deposition, Clinton's staff said that his statement was incorrect and that Clinton had since retracted that part of his testimony. Pritzker denied it, and reporting by KSDK and an analysis of flight records found that he was not listed in Epstein's plane's flight logs. The only trips Pritzker took with Clinton were a 2008 flight to Africa with 30 passengers that included Clinton's daughter Chelsea Clinton and American actors Ted Danson and Mary Steenburgen, and a flight in 2013 with Clinton, his security, and his staff. The same reporting also found that Epstein was on neither trip and was incarcerated at the time of the 2008 flight.

=== Social media and memes ===
On X (formerly Twitter), there are numerous accounts with names like "Socialists for Pritzker", "Nomadic Warriors for Pritzker", "Frat Bros for Pritzker", and "Anarchists for Pritzker". Socialists for Pritzker has over 13,000 followers. The accounts have been described as semi-ironic. Pritzker has said the attention is "entertaining, if a little strange" and that he keeps up with several of the accounts. Nomadic Warriors for Pritzker has dubbed Pritzker the "Great Khan of the Midwest" and mapped out battle plans for a Mongol Empire-inspired military campaign across the nation. The group of accounts, dubbed the "Pritzker Pals", launched a website, coconutbigboy.com, with the goal of influencing Vice President Kamala Harris to pick Pritzker as her running mate in the 2024 presidential election.

A TikTok account called "Pritzker Memes" garnered 20,000 followers. Some of the memes relate to Pritzker's size, with one political commentator saying, "He is enormous, doesn't come off as particularly intellectual, and has good instincts".

Pritzker launched his own beer brand, JBeers, ahead of the 2024 Democratic National Convention in Chicago. He also named Malört the DNC's "unofficial shot".

On February 7, 2025, after President Trump announced that the Gulf of Mexico had been renamed the "Gulf of America", Pritzker posted a satirical video on his personal Twitter account announcing Illinois's annexation of Green Bay, Wisconsin, and the renaming of Lake Michigan to "Lake Illinois".

== Philanthropy ==
Through the Pritzker Family Foundation, Pritzker has funded research and programs focused on children in poverty. Under the leadership of economist James Heckman, he supported the creation of the Pritzker Consortium on Early Childhood Development at the University of Chicago. With the Bill & Melinda Gates Foundation, the Buffett Early Childhood Fund, the Irving Harris Foundation, and the George Kaiser Family Foundation, the Pritzker Family Foundation is a founding supporter of the First Five Years Fund, an organization focusing nationwide attention and resources on comprehensive, quality early care and learning programs for children from birth to age five. In 2013, Pritzker worked with Goldman Sachs to fund the first-ever social impact bond for early childhood education.

As chairman of the Illinois Holocaust Museum and Education Center, which opened in 2009, Pritzker led the capital campaign and planning to build an international institution in the Midwest dedicated to teaching the lessons of the Holocaust and other genocides. He is the principal funder of Cambodia Tribunal Monitor, the most significant online source for news and commentaries on the international criminal tribunal created to bring to justice the perpetrators of Pol Pot-era acts of genocide. He chaired the Illinois Human Rights Commission, and was succeeded by former White House counsel and federal judge Abner J. Mikva. In 2013, Pritzker received the Survivors' Legacy Award for his leadership in the creation of the Illinois Holocaust Museum and Education Center.

In 2007, Pritzker and his wife donated $5 million to the University of South Dakota to build the Theodore R. and Karen K. Muenster University Center in honor of his wife's parents. In 2011, Milton Academy dedicated the Pritzker Science Center for which Pritzker provided the lead gift. Pritzker is a trustee and serves on the investment committee of Northwestern University. He is a member of the Board of Governors of Northwestern University School of Law. He is a member of the Economic Club of Chicago and the Commercial Club of Chicago. He joined the Duke University Board of Trustees in 2017; his term expires in 2023.

On October 22, 2015, Northwestern University School of Law announced that Pritzker and his wife, M. K. Pritzker, had made a $100 million gift to the school in honor of Pritzker's great-grandfather, Nicholas J. Pritzker. The 156-year-old school was renamed the Northwestern Pritzker School of Law.

Pritzker received the Spirit of Erikson Institute Award for his creation of the Children's Initiative. Pritzker organized the White House Summit on Early Childhood Education for President Barack Obama in 2014 and helped expand school breakfast programs in Illinois to over 230,000 kids in low income school districts.

The Better Government Association, an Illinois watchdog, has criticized Pritzker's charitable giving practices, saying he funneled the funds he gave to charity from offshore tax havens. "The result is that Pritzker's philanthropy, and any accolades that go with it, have been bankrolled with what is essentially found money. He did little to earn the proceeds and paid no taxes on the bulk of it before giving it away", the BGA wrote. Pritzker's campaign admitted that funds from overseas were given to charity, saying, "JB Pritzker has never taken a disbursement from an overseas trust, and has directed that all disbursements from those trusts go to charity."

== Personal life ==
In 1993, Pritzker married Mary Kathryn "M. K." Muenster, whom he had met in Washington, D.C., when she worked as an aide to U.S. senator Tom Daschle. She is one of three children of Theodore and Karen Muenster. Her father unsuccessfully ran for the U.S. Senate in 1990 and her mother served in the South Dakota Senate. They live in Chicago's Gold Coast neighborhood with their two children.

During the 2018 campaign, the Chicago Sun-Times reported that Pritzker and his wife had purchased a mansion next door to their home in 2017. The mansion remained vacant and the interior was in disrepair. He then appealed his original property tax assessment because the newly built property was uninhabitable, in part because it had "no functioning bathrooms or kitchen"; the Cook County assessor reduced the home's value from $6.25 million to about $1.1 million, which granted Pritzker an 83% property tax reduction, equal to about $230,000. The Cook County inspector general accused Pritzker of a scheme to defraud the county. Pritzker called the controversy a political attack and stressed that the county regulations had been followed, but paid the county treasurer $330,000 to reimburse the amount of the property tax reduction. To defend his claim that regulations were followed, Pritzker's campaign pointed to notes from an appraiser in the inspector general report that said the property was in "very poor condition", noting that the staircase was "structurally unsound" and "dangerous". One appraiser had called the mansion "uninhabitable" since 2012, five years before Pritzker bought it. Federal authorities later opened an investigation into the matter.

According to Forbes, as of August 2025, Pritzker's estimated net worth is $3.9 billion. A 2018 Chicago Tribune investigation uncovered several overseas trusts and shell companies connected to Pritzker and his siblings. Pritzker has said that the trusts his grandfather established yield no personal benefit to him and are used only for charitable contributions. According to The Wall Street Journal, Pritzker is the second-richest U.S. politician as of 2025.

On September 21, 2026, Pritzker said he had been taking a GLP-1 drug for about two years to lose weight and control his blood sugar level. Pritzker talked about his use despite his previous refusal to discuss it because he "came to the conclusion that it would be helpful to others to hear why I went on a GLP-1 and what the effect has been for me". Pritzker began taking the drug after being diagnosed with type 2 diabetes and told that he would have to take insulin for the rest of his life. He said that since starting the drug he has been able to stop taking insulin and has lost about 80 pounds (36 kg). Pritzker's use of GLP-1 is covered by the State of Illinois's health insurance plan, which was expanded in July 2023 to cover the drug for state employees with physician approval. The expansion was put in place before Pritzker began using a GLP-1 drug.

== Electoral history ==
Illinois 9th Congressional District Democratic Primary, 1998
Party	Candidate	Votes	%
Democratic	Jan Schakowsky	31,443	45.14
Democratic	Howard W. Carroll	23,963	34.40
Democratic	JB Pritzker	14,256	20.46
Total votes		69,662	100.0

Illinois Governor Democratic primary, 2018
Party	Candidate	Votes	%
Democratic	JB Pritzker	597,756	45.13
Democratic	Daniel Biss	353,625	26.70
Democratic	Chris Kennedy	322,730	24.37
Democratic	Tio Hardiman	21,075	1.59
Democratic	Bob Daiber	15,009	1.13
Democratic	Robert Marshall	14,353	1.08
Total votes		1,324,548	100.0

Illinois Gubernatorial Election, 2018
Party	Candidate	Votes	%
Democratic	JB Pritzker	2,479,746	54.53
Republican	Bruce Rauner (incumbent)	1,765,751	38.83
Conservative	Sam McCann	192,527	4.23
Libertarian	Kash Jackson	109,518	2.41
Write-in		115	0.00
Total votes		4,547,657	100.0

Illinois Governor Democratic primary, 2022
Party	Candidate	Votes	%
Democratic	JB Pritzker (incumbent)	762,374	91.8
Democratic	Beverly Miles	68,161	8.2
Total votes		830,535	100.0

Illinois Gubernatorial Election, 2022
Party	Candidate	Votes	%
Democratic	JB Pritzker (incumbent)	2,253,748	54.9
Republican	Darren Bailey	1,739,095	42.3
Libertarian	Scott Schluter	111,712	2.7
Write-in		81	0.00
Total votes		4,104,636	100.0

Illinois Gubernatorial Election, 2026
Party	Candidate	Votes	%
Democratic	JB Pritzker (incumbent)	2,416,528	59.8
Republican	Darren Bailey	1,490,446	36.9
Independent	Collin Corbett	135,985	3.4
Total votes		4,042,959	100.0

Party political offices
Preceded by Pat Quinn	Democratic nominee for Governor of Illinois; 2018, 2022, 2026	Most recent
Political offices
Preceded by Bruce Rauner	Governor of Illinois; 2019–present	Incumbent
U.S. order of precedence (ceremonial)
Preceded by JD Vance as Vice President	Order of precedence of the United States; Within Illinois	Succeeded by Mayor of city in which event is held
Preceded by JD Vance as Vice President	Order of precedence of the United States; Within Illinois	Succeeded by Otherwise Mike Johnson as Speaker of the House
Preceded by Tate Reeves as Governor of Mississippi	Order of precedence of the United States; Outside Illinois	Succeeded by Kay Ivey as Governor of Alabama
