= Invest in US =

Invest in US is an early childhood education initiative and public awareness campaign spearheaded by the bi-partisan, non-profit First Five Years Fund and funded by foundations, corporations, and individuals. The initiative works to expand high quality early childhood programs and research, as well as to offer resources to community leaders working to increase access to early learning.

== White House summit on early education ==
On December 10, 2014, President Obama held the White House Summit on Early Education, attended by officials representing school districts and state and local governments, corporate and community leaders, and other advocates for supporting early education in the U.S.

At the event, the president unveiled the Invest in US initiative, created in partnership with the First Five Years Fund. The initiative's goal is to expand programs, research, and funding for high quality early childhood education. This public-private partnership initially generated $333 million in philanthropic commitments from corporations, foundations, and individuals (total commitments increased to just over $340 million by December 2015). More than $750 million in federal funding for early learning programs through the Preschool Development Grants and Early Head Start-Child Care (EHS-CC) Partnerships were also announced to support early learning for over 63,000 additional children across the country. Of the $750 million total, $250 million was awarded in Education Department grants to these 18 states: Alabama, Arizona, Arkansas, Connecticut, Hawaii, Illinois, Louisiana, Maine, Maryland, Massachusetts, Montana, Nevada, New Jersey, New York, Rhode Island, Tennessee, Vermont and Virginia. And $500 million in funding from the Health and Human Services Department is going to more than 40 states to expand Early Head Start and child care programs.

The Invest in US and federal funding combined targeted more than $1 billion in funding for early childhood education. Though praised by early learning advocates, the funding was noted by several sources to be far short of the $75 billion, 10-year investment in preschool that President Obama had previously proposed.

== ROI of expanded early learning opportunities ==
The White House made the case that increasing access to high-quality early learning opportunities would not only benefit those children reached but American society generally and that early learning programs actually pay for themselves over time. In a conference call with reporters the day before the White House Summit, Education Secretary Arne Duncan made the case for investing in early education, citing research from Nobel Prize-winning economist James Heckman that showed that every dollar invested in high-quality preschool and other early learning opportunities can generate an $7 ROI.

The Invest in US fact sheet released by the White House on the day of the summit increased that 7-to-1 ROI projection, stating that expanding early learning initiatives should provide benefits to society of around $8.60 for every $1 spent.

== Largest corporate and foundation supporters ==
Corporations and foundations pledging $10 million or more to support the Invest in US initiative included Disney, the J.B. and M.K. Pritzker Family Foundation, the Kresge Foundation, the George Kaiser Family Foundation, PBS and the Corporation for Public Broadcasting, the Buffett Early Childhood Fund, the Trust for Learning, Robert Wood Johnson Foundation, the David and Laura Merage Foundation, the Greater Cleveland Community Effort, the William Penn Foundation, the Bainum Family Foundation, and Age of Learning, Inc. / ABCmouse.com.

== Communities and states ==
In addition to the organizations and individuals who pledged financial support for Invest in US, 22 communities and states committed to making early childhood programs a policy priority, and over 40 advocacy organizations announced ongoing support of the initiative. Cities supporting the initiative included Boston, Chicago Cleveland, Denver, New York City, San Antonio, San Francisco, Seattle, and Tulsa; states included Alabama, Delaware, Georgia, Nebraska, Pennsylvania, and West Virginia.

== Key organizations ==
The initiative also identified 10 organizations that would continue to help funders with early learning planning grants, technical assistance, communities, and resources: Alliance for Early Success, BUILD, Early Childhood Funders Collaborative, Early Childhood-LINC, National Association of Counties, National Governors Association, National Institute for Early Education Research (NIEER), National League of Cities, The Ounce of Prevention Fund, and the U.S. Conference of Mayors.

== Follow up events and announcements ==
On March 30, 2015, Invest in US partner Houghton Mifflin Harcourt launched a series of quarterly symposia, called Conversations in Early Learning, to promote collaboration within the early education community. On April 15–16, the 2015 ECEC Invest in US Forum was held in Washington, D.C., “to amplify the voice of high-quality taxpaying and non-profit community early care and education providers” and to hold “discussions of policy issues impacting the provider community.” In September, 2015, Invest in US and other partners announced a new $100 million loan fund to pay for early childhood education providers’ classroom renovations and other infrastructure improvements that they project will benefit 36,000 children.

A December 2015 event was held in Washington, D.C., to commemorated the first anniversary of the 2014 White House summit on early childhood education and to announce a related program, the Early Childhood Innovation Network. At the event, Valerie Jarrett, President Obama's senior advisor, spoke about the first year of Invest in US: “Invest in US has continued to press for more children to have this very important access to early education and we’ve been holding webinars and filming PSAs and meeting with stakeholders from all across the country, and we have just done tremendous work, but we want to keep leading and we want to get everyone engaged.” At the same event, the Wolf Trap Foundation for the Performing Arts announced it would become the latest partner in the Invest in US campaign, pledging more than $1 million for early childhood education in 2016.
