= Start Early =

Nonprofit organization in Chicago, Illinois, US

Ounce of Prevention Fund
- Formation: 1982
- Type: Non-profit
- Legal status: 501(c)(3)
- Region served: Cook County
- President: Diana Rauner
- Main organ: Board of Directors
- Website: www.startearly.org

Start Early, formerly known as The Ounce of Prevention Fund, is a nonprofit organization in Chicago that promotes early childhood development in underserved communities across Illinois. Their programs include Educare Chicago, the Educare Learning Network, and Home Visits for Homeless Families. They base their programs off of early childhood development research.

== History ==
The Ounce of Prevention Fund was founded by businessman and philanthropist Irving B. Harris in 1982. Harris believed that time needed to be dedicated early on in the lives of children in Chicago's impoverished communities to fight the cycle of poverty. It is why Start Early focuses on early childhood education, home visiting programs, lobbying, and research for early childhood development.

Throughout the late 1980s Start Early created and funded its early programs such as the Center for Successful Child Development, and its home visiting services. In 1983, Start Early worked to reduce the economic costs associated with teen pregnancy and parenting by working with local Chicago community agencies.

In 1991, Harriet Meyer, then the executive director of Start Early, was appointed president of the nonprofit. As president of Start Early, she lobbied for early childhood development programs. In 2010, Meyer stepped down and Diana Rauner became the organization's president. Prior to her appointment as president, Rauner served as the executive director and a board member for Start Early. She followed Meyer's lead of lobbying for early childhood development programs and funding in her 2017 suit towards then governor of Illinois and husband Bruce Rauner due to a lack of funding by the state budget.

In 2013, Start Early disbursed around $17 million to early childhood agencies around the state.

In 2020, The Ounce of Prevention Fund officially rebranded to Start Early.

== Programs and partnerships ==
=== Educare Chicago ===
Educare Chicago is a school on Chicago's South Side for children ages 0 to 5 that was founded by Start Early and the Irving Harris Foundation in 2000. The Montessori-style curriculum of the school provides classes that focus on the emotional and academic development of children in the early stages of their lives. The school also puts emphasis on parent involvement in their child's emotional, social and academic development.

After partnering with The Buffet Early Childhood Fund, the model used for Educare has been expanded to 24 other schools in the United States.

=== Home Visiting for Homeless Families Demonstration Project ===
The Home Visiting for Homeless Families Demonstration Project partners with providers of home visits in the Chicago community and homeless shelters to bring medical resources to homeless families. Started in Fall of 2013, the program focuses on helping homeless families get the medical attention and health-related resources they need. In the same year of its start, the Homeless Families Demonstration Project provided service to 160 families. From 2013 to 2018 the program encountered funding problems.

=== University of Chicago Urban Education Institute ===
Start Early partnered with the University of Chicago Urban Education Institute (UEI) in 2009 to conduct further research and build education models that help children and families in low income areas succeed in and outside of school.

Start Early has collaborated with Illinois Governor's Office, Chapin Hall at the University of Chicago, Children's Home and Aid, and Healthy Families Illinois to help Erikson Institute steer committee initiative and train home visiting staff.

== Funding ==
Start Early is a public and privately financed nonprofit with an annual budget of $74 million. Some of its large funders include the Irving Harris Foundation, the Harris Family Foundation, the Robert McCormick Foundation, the Steans Family Foundation, Helen and Sam Zell, the Crown family, and the Buffett Early Childhood Fund.

In 2014, Start Early received a $10 million donation from the Zell Family Foundation.

In 2016, the Pritzker Children's Initiative, run by J. B. Pritzker and Mary Kathryn Muenster, donated $5 million to Start Early.
