= Diana Rauner =

American philanthropist

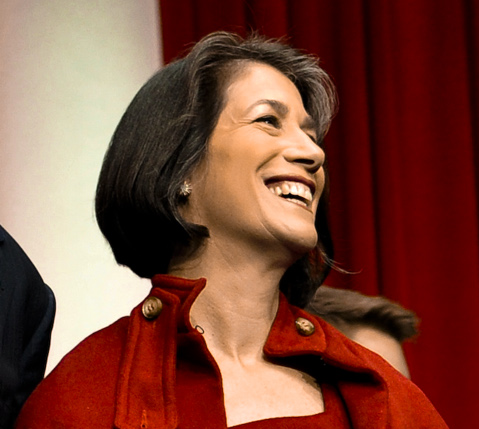

First Lady of Illinois
- In role January 12, 2015 – January 14, 2019
- Governor: Bruce Rauner
- Preceded by: Patricia Blagojevich (2009)
- Succeeded by: MK Pritzker

Personal details
- Born: Diana Elizabeth Mendley; 1961 (age 64–65) New York City, New York, U.S.
- Party: Democratic
- Spouse(s): Lewis Ingall (m. 1989; div. 1991) Bruce Rauner (m. 1994)
- Children: Three (with Rauner); Three stepchildren
- Education: Yale University (BA); Stanford University (MBA); University of Chicago (PhD)

Diana Mendley Rauner (born 1961) is an American businesswoman and president of Start Early, a non-profit in Chicago. She served as the First Lady of Illinois from 2015 to 2019 as her husband, Bruce, served as governor.

== Early life ==
Rauner was born and raised in New York City, where she was the youngest of three children in a Reform Jewish home. She attended Yale University, where she was also a champion fencer. She was All-Ivy First Team in fencing in 1981-82, and 1982-83. She received her MBA from Stanford University, and her PhD in development psychology from the University of Chicago.

== First Lady of Illinois (2015-2019) ==
Rauner is a Democrat, but in 2014 when her husband Bruce Rauner, a Republican, became the Republican nominee for governor of Illinois in the 2014 Illinois gubernatorial election, Rauner appeared in a TV ad for her husband saying "I'm a lifelong Democrat, but enough is enough and the Democratic politicians in Springfield have got to be controlled and I know that is what my husband will do as governor."

On July 18, 2016, Rauner announced a $15 million renovation project for the Illinois Executive Mansion, with the funding being raised privately. The work was planned to be completed by the Illinois bicentennial in 2018.

== Other activities ==
She serves as president of Start Early, formerly known as the Ounce of Prevention Fund, an early-learning advocacy organization. In June 2016, The Ounce of Prevention joined a lawsuit fund with other social organizations against her husband, the governor, and various state agencies; the lawsuit demanded payment for services rendered by the agencies, many of which had not received payment for over a year.
