= Illinois Governor's Mansion =

Historic house in Illinois, United States

- Executive Mansion
- U.S. National Register of Historic Places
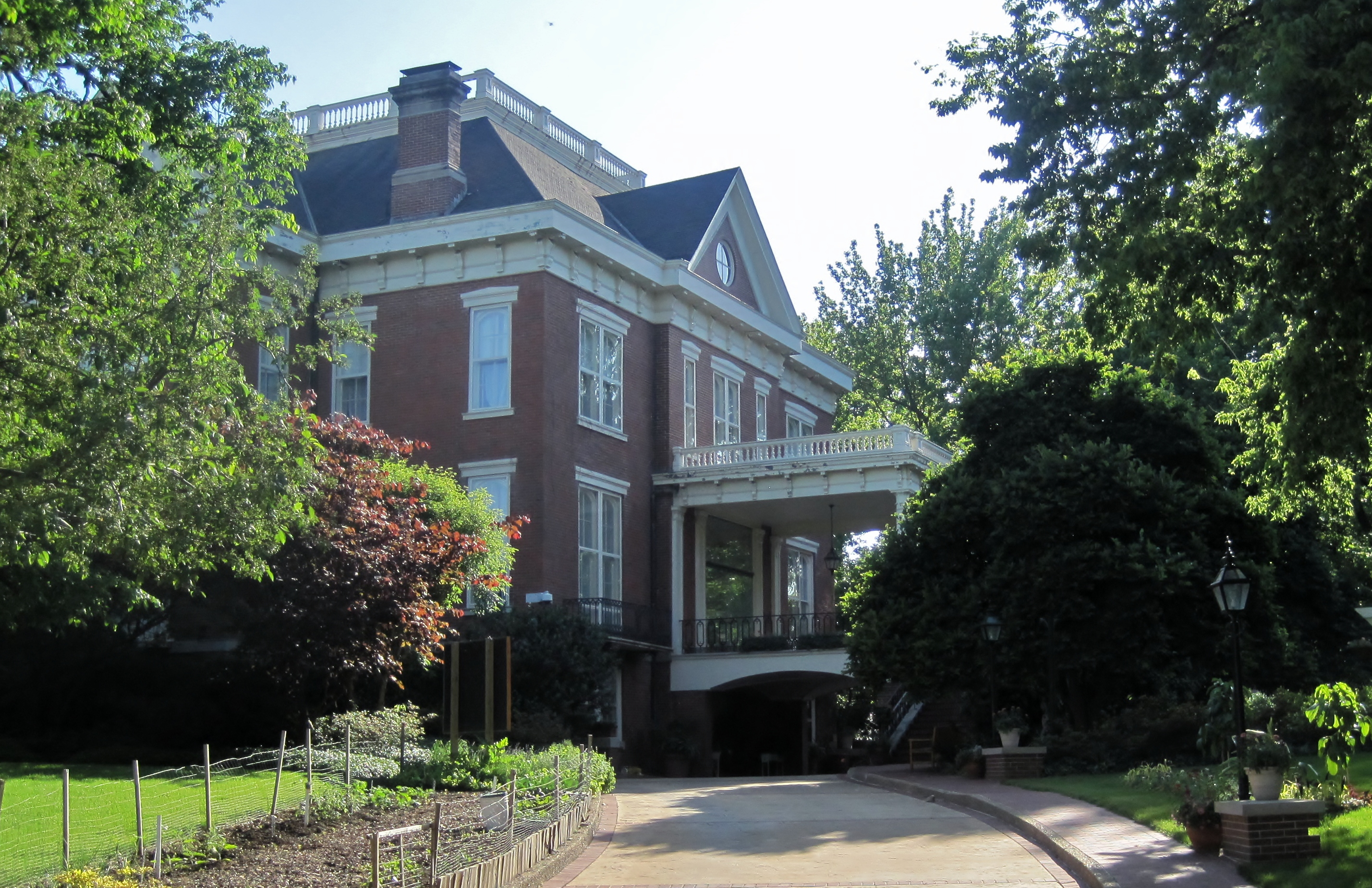
- Mansion in 2012

- Location within Illinois Location within the United States
- Location: 410 E. Jackson Street, Springfield, IL
- Coordinates: 39°47′47″N 89°39′0.6″W
- Built: 1855
- Architect: John Murray Van Osdel
- Architectural style: Italianate
- NRHP reference No.: 76000728
- Added to NRHP: July 19, 1976

The Illinois Governor's Mansion (formerly, Illinois Executive Mansion) is the official residence of the governor of Illinois. It is located in the state capital of Springfield, Illinois, near the Illinois State Capitol building, and the Lincoln Home National Historic Site.

== Description ==
The Italianate-style Mansion was designed by Chicago architect John M. Van Osdel with a modified I-shaped configuration with a long central section stretching front to back. The 16-room manor was completed in 1855 and was first occupied by governor Joel Matteson, who held the official grand opening on January 10, 1856. It is one of the oldest historic residences in the state of Illinois and one of the three oldest continuously occupied governor's mansions in the United States. At approximately 45,000 square feet, it is also the largest Governor's Residence in the Country. In 1898 alterations to the exterior added neoclassical elements. In 1972, the Illinois Governor's Mansion Association was founded as a charitable corporation to assist in the maintenance and programming at the mansion. The Mansion was added to the National Register of Historic Places in 1976.

During the Christmas season the mansion is decorated lavishly with Christmas decorations, including over a dozen Christmas trees. While used for state functions such as state dinners and meetings, the mansion is also a house museum open to the public. The public libraries, bedrooms, parlors, sitting rooms, etc., are maintained in the style of the 19th century, blended with some later and modern pieces. The governor and his family are not required to reside in the mansion, although a 7-room private apartment on the second floor of the mansion is provided for the governor and his family.

Governor George Ryan and First Lady Lura Lynn Ryan refurbished much of the mansion's furniture during their 1999 - 2003 tenure using private donations. In 2011, a multimillion-dollar renovation was planned because the last repairs to the mansion were in 1971.

The 2014 polar vortex led to significant water damage to the mansion, and Governor Pat Quinn, who chose to live in the mansion part-time, allocated about $40,000 in emergency repairs. Shortly after his election as governor, Bruce Rauner announced that he and his wife would invest some of their money into repairing the mansion so they could live in it during his term. On July 18, 2016, Illinois First Lady Diana Rauner announced a $15 million renovation project for the mansion, with the funding being raised privately. The work was completed for the Illinois bicentennial in 2018.

Governor Rauner signed an executive order renaming the Executive Mansion, the Illinois Governor's Mansion, which became effective July 1, 2018. The renovated mansion includes a new visitor center, and made the mansion compliant with the Americans with Disabilities Act.

Using private funds, additional renovations to guest rooms, fixtures, and plumbing were done in fall 2019, under Governor J.B. Pritzker. In 2023, First Lady M.K. Pritzker, with the help of designer Michael S. Smith, completed an updated refurbishment of the interior and they published a book detailing the home's history, architecture and design with Rizzoli, A House That Made History: The Illinois Governor's Mansion.
