= Illinois Department of Commerce and Economic Opportunity =

Code department of the Illinois state government

Department of Commerce and Economic Opportunity
Department overview
- Jurisdiction: Illinois
- Department executive: Kristin Richards, Director of Commerce and Economic Opportunity
- Website: dceo.illinois.gov

The Illinois Department of Commerce and Economic Opportunity (DCEO) is the code department of the Illinois state government that sponsors statewide economic development, with special emphases on increasing minority entrepreneurship, promoting the tourism industry, and recruiting Illinois as a location for business investment and film production.

DCEO's Business Information Center is a single statewide resource for entrepreneurs and businesses to obtain comprehensive regulatory and permitting information. Business specialists provide professional guidance to entrepreneurs by helping them identify and navigate regulatory requirements for their business and link them to state and local resources. DCEO's Regulatory Flexibility Program helps small businesses understand state regulations that might apply to them. Its Small Business Environmental Assistance Program provides free and confidential consultations to small businesses on environmental compliance issues.

DCEO administers a variety of grant, loan, and tax credit programs.
