= Ted Muenster =

American political advisor and businessman

- Born: Beatrice, Nebraska, U.S.
- Education: University of Nebraska–Lincoln (BS, MA)
- Occupations: businessman, campaign manager, political advisor
- Political party: Democratic
- Spouse: Karen Nelsen (died 2026)
- Children: 3 (including MK Pritzker)
- Relatives: JB Pritzker (son-in-law)

Theodore R. Muenster Jr. is an American political advisor, academic administrator, businessman, and former political candidate. He was the Democratic nominee during the 1990 United States Senate election in South Dakota. He later was chief of staff to South Dakota Governor Richard Kneip. He was inducted into the South Dakota Hall of Fame in 2009.

== Early life and education ==
Muenster was born and raised in Beatrice, Nebraska. His family was very politically involved and his grandfather, Benjamin Albin Goble, was the Sheriff of Gage County. His parents, Theodore R. Meunster Sr. and Marcelene Meunster, owned and managed a farm that had been given to their family as a land grant during the American Civil War.

He graduated from Beatrice High School in 1958. He graduated from the University of Nebraska–Lincoln in 1962 with a degree in political science and history. He later returned to the university to complete a master's degree in political science. Muenster received a graduate fellowship from the National Center for Education in Politics at New York University.

== Career ==
Muenster worked as a staff assistant for the Minnesota Governor Karl F. Rolvaag from 1963 to 1964 and before for managing the successful congressional campaign for Nebraska Congressman Clair Callan.

In 1967, upon moving to Vermillion, South Dakota, he was employed as the director of the Institute of Public Affairs at the University of South Dakota. He later worked as chief of staff for Governor Richard Kneip, was vice president of the University of South Dakota, chief executive officer SoDak Distributing, and president of the University of South Dakota Foundation.

Muenster was a board member of the University of Nebraska Alumni Association and a trustee for the Nebraska University Foundation.

In 1990, he won the Democratic Party's nomination for the 1990 United States Senate election in South Dakota. He lost the election to Republican politician Larry Pressler.

== Personal life ==
Muenster is married to Senator Karen Muenster, who was minority whip in the South Dakota Senate. They have three children, including Illinois First Lady Mary Kathryn Muenster Pritzker. He lives in the Cathedral Historic District in Sioux Falls.

Muenster was inducted into the South Dakota Hall of Fame in 2009.
