= Illinois Department of Healthcare and Family Services =

State government organization in Illinois

Department of Healthcare and Family Services

Department overview
- Jurisdiction: Illinois
- Department executive: Theresa Eagleson, Director of Healthcare and Family Services
- Website: www.illinois.gov/hfs/

The Illinois Department of Healthcare and Family Services (HFS), formerly the Department of Public Aid, is the code department of the Illinois state government that is responsible for providing healthcare coverage for adults and children who qualify for Medicaid, and for providing child support services to help ensure that Illinois children receive financial support from both parents.

The department is organized into two major divisions, Medical Programs and Child Support Services. The Office of Inspector General is maintained within the agency, but functions as a separate, independent entity reporting directly to the governor's office. The department maintains a mission statement and a statement of vision. Its current director (as of 2022) is Theresa Eagleson.

== Division of Medical Programs ==
The Division of Medical Programs administers and, in conjunction with the federal government, funds medical services provided to about 25 percent of the state's population.

Illinois’ medical assistance programs, consisting of Medicaid and numerous other medical programs associated with it, provide comprehensive health-care coverage to about 3.2 million Illinoisans. The programs cover children, parents or relatives caring for children, pregnant women, veterans, seniors, eligible individuals, and persons who are blind and persons with disabilities.

The medical assistance programs are administered under provisions of the Illinois Public Aid Code; Illinois Children's Health Insurance Program Act; Covering All Kids Health Insurance Act; and Titles XIX and XXI of the federal Social Security Act. The department's mission is to improve the health status of the individuals enrolled in its programs, while simultaneously containing costs and maintaining program integrity.

== Division of Child Support Services ==
The Division of Child Support Services provides services to custodial and noncustodial parents by establishing paternity as well as establishing, enforcing and modifying child-support obligations to strengthen families emotionally and financially. Child support services are available to all families, regardless of income, and to either parent.

To qualify for federal child-support services funds, each state must have a centralized unit to receive and distribute child-support payments made through income withholding, even if a family has not enrolled in the full child-support services program. In fiscal year 2015, more than $1.4 billion was collected in support owed to Illinois children.

== The Office of Inspector General ==
The Inspector General is appointed by and reports to the Governor and is confirmed by the Senate. The mission of the Office of the Inspector General is to prevent, detect and eliminate fraud, waste, abuse, misconduct and mismanagement in the programs administered by the Departments of Healthcare and Family Services and Human Services.

The current Inspector General is Peter B. Neumer.
