= Office of the Illinois State Fire Marshal =

State agency in Illinois, United States

Commission overview
- Jurisdiction: Illinois

The Office of the Illinois State Fire Marshal (OSFM) is the Illinois state government office that oversees local firefighting activities within Illinois. Local Illinois fire departments are autonomous, and the OSFM provides backup services to these local forces and coordinates their activities. The OSFM operates a public outreach arm to increase public awareness about fire safety and prevention. The OSFM has an investigative arm, and possesses the capability to investigate fires in which a fatality or great loss has occurred.

In addition to firefighting coordination, the OSFM has significant regulatory responsibilities. The Office is the regulatory agency of record, for Illinois, in the safety inspection of a wide variety of boilers, pressure vessels, and tanks that contain or can be filled with flammable or heated materials. The Office is the regulatory agency of record in the professional qualification and licensure of Illinois elevator contractors.
