= Governor of Illinois =

Head of government of the U.S. state of Illinois

- Seal of the State of Illinois

- Incumbent; JB Pritzker since January 14, 2019
- Government of Illinois
- Residence: Illinois Governor's Mansion
- Term length: Four years, no term limits
- Inaugural holder: Shadrach Bond
- Formation: October 6, 1818
- Succession: Line of succession
- Deputy: Lieutenant Governor of Illinois
- Salary: $177,412 (2015) (Note: Former governor of Illinois Bruce Rauner, who was independently wealthy, has previously stated that he would only accept $1 in salary. In 2015, the Council of State Governments reported that Rauner had returned all but $1 of his salary to the State of Illinois. However, the pay rate for the title of governor in Illinois remains at $177,412.) (Note: After billionaire J. B. Pritzker spent a record $171.5 million of his own personal fortune to fund his campaign to win the governor's seat, he decided not to accept a state salary during his time in office.)
- Website: Government website

The governor of Illinois is the head of government of Illinois, and the various agencies and departments over which the officer has jurisdiction, as prescribed in the state constitution. It is a directly elected position, votes being cast by popular suffrage of residents of the state. The governor is responsible for endorsing or vetoing laws passed by the Illinois General Assembly. The office also carries the power of pardon and commutation under state law. The governor is commander-in-chief of the state's land, air and sea forces when they are in state service. Illinois is one of 13 states that does not place a term limit for governor. (Note: Along with Connecticut, Idaho, Iowa, Massachusetts, Minnesota, New York, Texas, Utah, Washington, Wisconsin, District of Columbia, Vermont, New Hampshire and Puerto Rico.)

The 43rd and current governor is JB Pritzker, a Democrat who took office on January 14, 2018.

== Qualifications ==
The term of office of governor of Illinois is 4 years, and there is no limit on the number of terms a governor may serve. Inauguration takes place on the second Monday in January following a gubernatorial election in November. A single term ends four years later. A governor is required to be:

- at least 25 years old
- a United States citizen
- a resident of Illinois for 3 years prior to election

== Succession ==
If the incumbent governor is no longer able or permitted to fulfill the duties of the office of governor, the line of succession is as follows:

#	Position	Current office holder	Party
1	Lieutenant governor	Juliana Stratton	Democratic
2	Attorney General of Illinois	Kwame Raoul	Democratic
3	Secretary of State of Illinois	Alexi Giannoulias	Democratic

== Residence ==
The governor is allowed the occupancy of the Illinois Governor's Mansion in Springfield, the state capital. Its first occupant was Governor Joel Aldrich Matteson, who took residence at the mansion in 1855. It is one of three oldest governor's residences in continuous use in the United States.

The governor is also given the use of two official residences on the state fair grounds, located in Springfield and DuQuoin. The official residence in DuQuoin is Hayes House. Governors have traditionally used these residences part of the year.

However, some governors, such as Rod Blagojevich, have chosen to not use the governor's homes as their primary residence, instead commuting either by car or plane to Springfield from their home cities. Many Chicago-based governors also have done much of their business out of the governor's office in Chicago in a state-owned office building located on the 16th floor of 555 W. Monroe St.

== Timeline ==
Timeline of Illinois governors

== See also ==
- List of governors of Illinois
