= 1990 United States Senate election in South Dakota =

- November 6, 1990
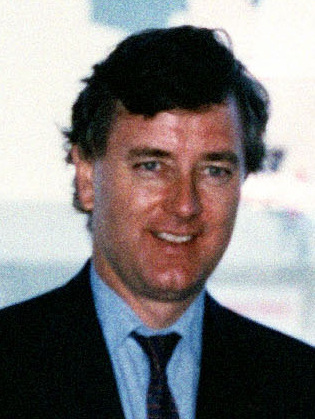

Nominee	Larry Pressler	Ted Muenster
Party	Republican	Democratic
Popular vote	135,682	116,727
Percentage	52.39%	45.07%
- County results Pressler: 40–50% 50–60% 60–70% 70–80% Muenster: 40–50% 50–60%
U.S. senator before election
Larry Pressler
Republican
Elected U.S. Senator
Larry Pressler
Republican

The 1990 United States Senate election in South Dakota was held on November 6, 1990. Incumbent Republican U.S. Senator Larry Pressler ran for re-election to a third term, beating Democratic nominee Theodore 'Ted' Muenster by 19,000 votes. This was the last time until 2014 that a Republican would be elected to South Dakota's Class 2 Senate seat.

== Candidates ==
=== Democratic ===
- Theodore 'Ted' Muenster, former dean at University of South Dakota, former chief of staff for Governor Kneip

=== Republican ===
- Larry Pressler, incumbent U.S. Senator

== Results ==
South Dakota U.S. Senate Election, 1990
Party	Candidate	Votes	%	±%
Republican	Larry Pressler (incumbent)	135,682	52.39%	−22.1%
Democratic	Theodore 'Ted' Muenster	116,727	45.07%	+19.56%
Independent	Dean L. Sinclair	6,567	2.54%	N/A
Majority		18,955	7.32%	−41.66%
Turnout		258,976	61.6%	−9.7%
Republican hold		Swing		

== See also ==
- 1990 United States Senate elections
