= MK Pritzker =

First Lady of Illinois

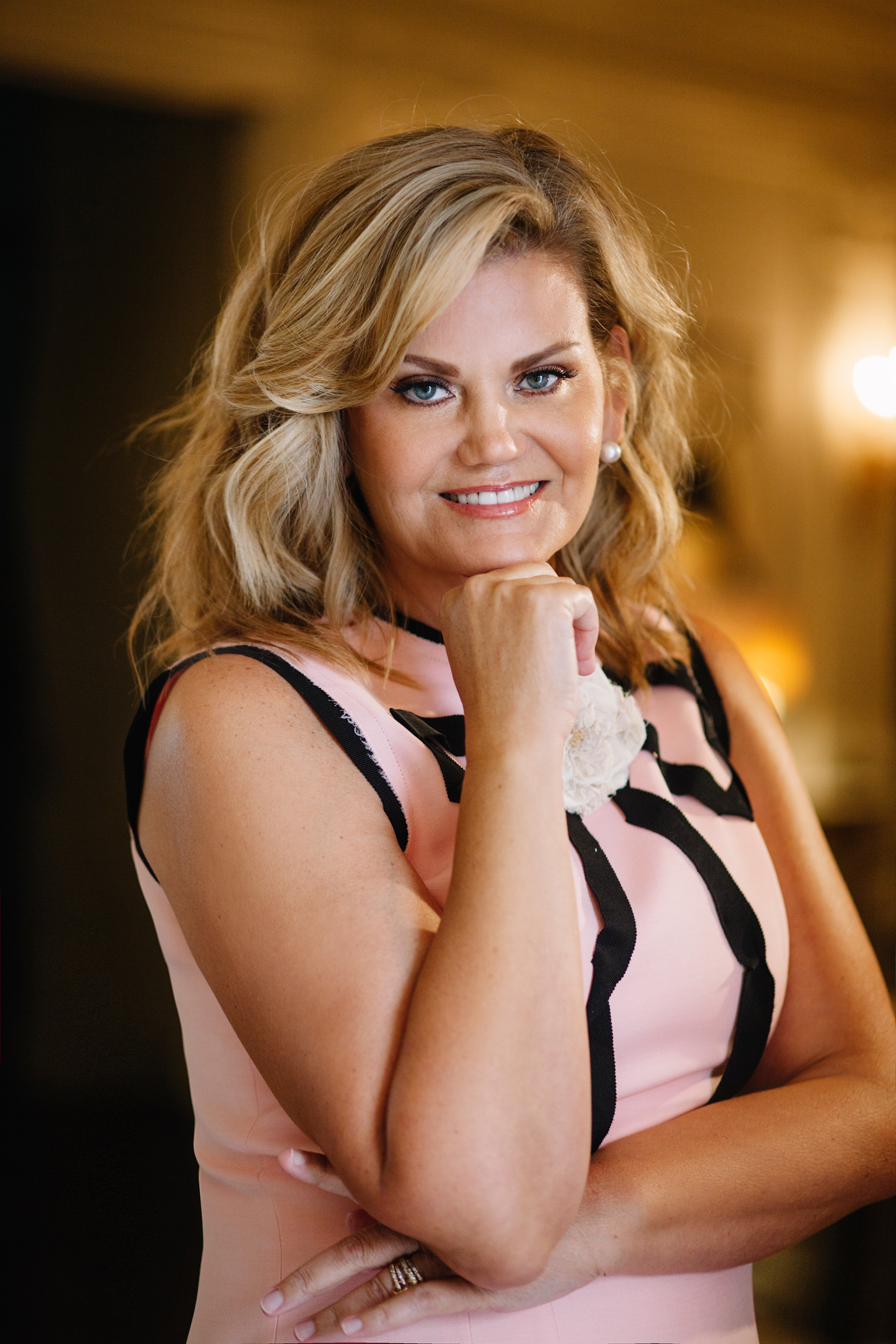
- Pritzker in 2023

First Lady of Illinois
- Current
- Assumed role January 14, 2019
- Governor: JB Pritzker
- Preceded by: Diana Rauner

Personal details
- Born: Mary Kathryn Muenster; 1967 (age 58–59) Lincoln, Nebraska, U.S.
- Party: Democratic
- Spouse: JB Pritzker (m. 1993)
- Children: 2
- Parent(s): Ted Muenster (father); Karen Nelsen (mother)
- Education: University of Nebraska–Lincoln (BA); School of the Art Institute of Chicago
- Website: Official Website

Mary Kathryn Pritzker (née Muenster; born 1967) is an American philanthropist. As the wife of Governor JB Pritzker, she has been the First Lady of Illinois since 2019. Pritzker is the former director of the Pritzker Family Foundation and is the founder of the Evergreen Invitational equestrian competition. In 2023, she authored a book about the Illinois Governor's Mansion titled A House That Made History: The Illinois Governors Mansion, Legacy of an Architectural Treasure.

== Early life and education ==
Pritzker was born Mary Kathryn Muenster in 1967 in Lincoln, Nebraska to Theodore Muenster Jr. and Karen Muenster. She grew up in a politically active family in Nebraska and Sioux Falls, South Dakota. Her father was the Democratic nominee in the 1990 US Senate election in South Dakota and served as chief of staff to Democratic Governor of South Dakota Richard F. Kneip. Her mother served in the South Dakota Senate from 1985 to 1992 and was the minority whip from 1988 to 1992. Pritzker's paternal great-grandfather, Benjamin Albin Goble, was the sheriff and county supervisor of Gage County, Nebraska. Pritzker's father grew up on a farm in Beatrice, Nebraska that had been given as a land grant to their family during the American Civil War. Her grandmother, Marcelene Muenster, taught her how to sew, crochet, bake, bookkeep, and take care of animals on the farm.

She graduated from the University of Nebraska–Lincoln with a bachelor of arts degree and attended graduate school at the Art Institute of Chicago, where she studied historic preservation.

== Career ==
Pritzker worked in Washington, D.C. as a staffer for U.S. Senate Majority Leader Tom Daschle and for U.S. Senator Bob Kerrey.

Pritzker was director of the Pritzker Family Foundation for over a decade, supporting the Pritzker Consortium, the First Five Years Fund, the Ounce of Prevention Fund, Erie Family Health, and Lawndale Christian Health. She was involved in building a scholarship and grant plan for Pritzker School of Law at Northwestern University focused on social justice, civil and human rights, and entrepreneurship initiatives.

She founded Evergreen Invitational, a nonprofit sanctioned equestrian show jumping competition that raised over $6 million for women's healthcare initiatives at Northwestern Memorial Hospital.

Pritzker is a member of the Daughters of the American Revolution and the White House Preservation Committee.

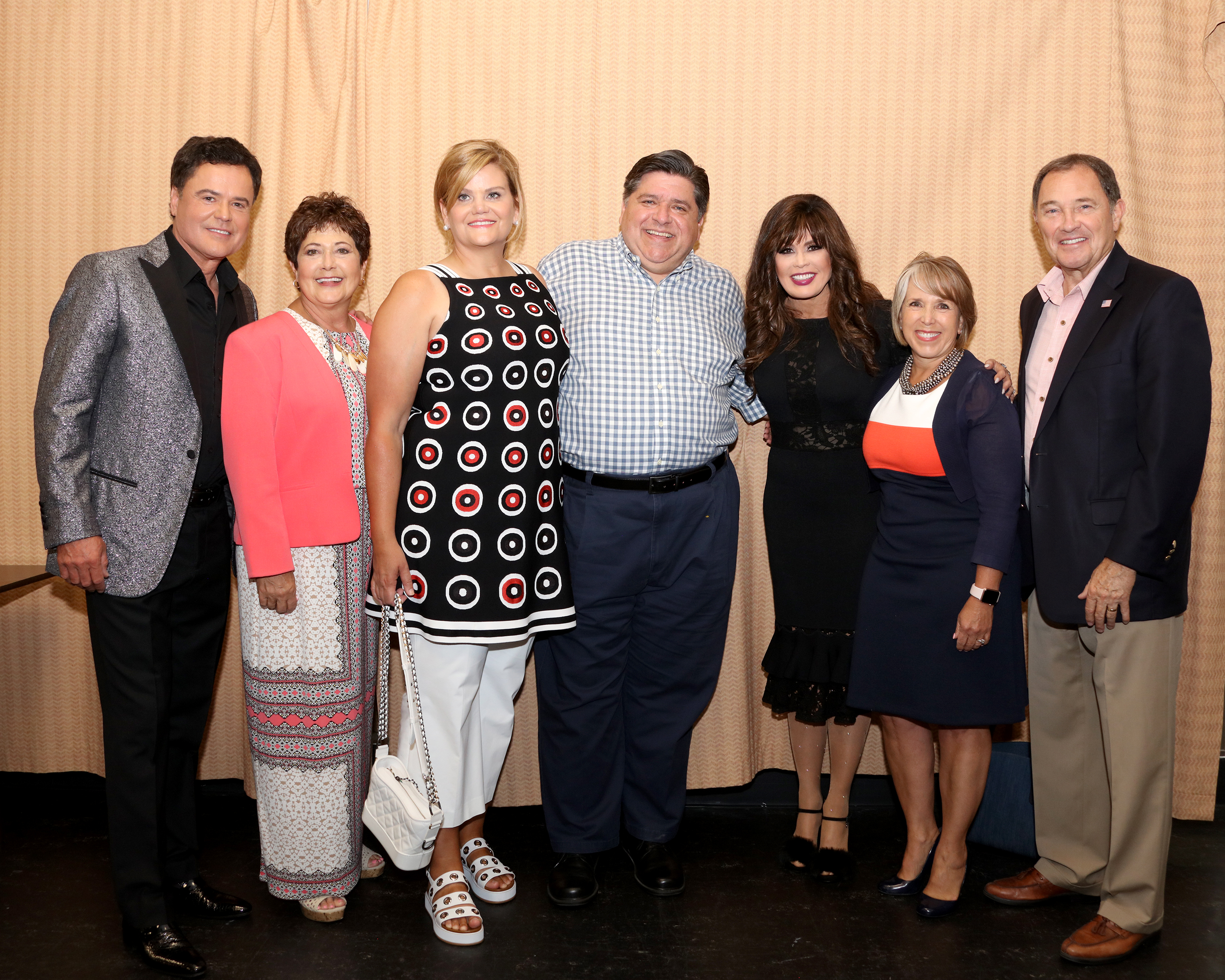
Pritzker (third from left) at the NGA Chairman Reception and Concert in 2019

On January 14, 2019, she became the first lady of Illinois upon her husband's inauguration as governor. As first lady, she focused on expanding access to reproductive healthcare, developing restorative criminal justice for incarcerated women, supported LGBTQ+ initiatives, and promoted the visual and performing arts. During the COVID-19 pandemic in Illinois, she revived the state's poet laureate and arts program, visited state prisons to interview incarcerated women, and co-chaired the Arts for Illinois Relief Fund. In 2023, Pritzker curated a collection of Illinois art and historic furniture to furnish the Illinois Governor's Mansion. She oversaw the mansion's renovations with the help of designer Michael S. Smith, with whom she published a book through Rizzoli detailing the home's history, architecture and design titled A House That Made History: The Illinois Governors Mansion, Legacy of an Architectural Treasure. Proceeds from the book went to maintain the upkeep of the mansion. She reframed photographs of forty former Illinois first ladies that she discovered in the mansion's attic and hung them in the mansion's galleries. Pritzker also archived recipes from the cookbooks of former first ladies and other Illinois political hostesses, including Mary Todd Lincoln's almond cake, which she now has served at mansion dinners.

On May 31, 2025, during the 129th annual conference of the Illinois State Society of the Daughters of the American Revolution in Bloomington, Pritzker was presented with a Historic Preservation Award for her work to restore the governor's mansion.

== Personal life ==
In 1993, she married Jay Robert "JB" Pritzker, whom she had met in Washington, D.C. when she worked as an aide to U.S. Senator Tom Daschle. Her husband, a billionaire businessman and Democratic politician, is a member of the Pritzker family that owns Hyatt Hotels. She and her husband live in Chicago's Gold Coast neighborhood with their two children. They also reside in the Illinois Governor's Mansion in Springfield since her husband's election as governor in 2019. She converted from Protestantism to Judaism, the faith of her husband.

Pritzker owns her family farm in Nebraska and another farm in Wisconsin. She has a herd of six miniature cows, given to her by her husband, as of 2023. She is an equestrian.
