= Karen Muenster =

American politician (1942–2026)

Member of the South Dakota Senate
- Assumed office 1985–1992

Personal details
- Born: Karen K. Nelsen; October 15, 1942 Deshler, Nebraska, U.S.
- Died: April 3, 2026 (aged 83) Vermillion, South Dakota, U.S.
- Party: Democratic
- Spouse: Theodore R. Muenster Jr.
- Children: 3 (including MK Pritzker)
- Education: Sacred Heart Women's College; University of Nebraska–Lincoln
- Occupation: Politician, businesswoman

Karen K. Muenster (née Nelsen; October 15, 1942 – April 3, 2026) was an American politician and businesswoman. A Democrat, she served in the South Dakota Senate from 1985 to 1992 and was the minority whip from 1988 to 1992. She previously served on the Vermillion City Council.

== Early life and education ==
Muenster was born on October 15, 1942, in Deshler, Nebraska. She grew up in Hebron, Nebraska. She was educated at private Catholic institutions, graduating from Mount Carmel Academy and Sacred Heart Women's College in Wichita, Kansas. Muenster went on to attend the University of Nebraska–Lincoln, where she was a member of Alpha Xi Delta and served as president of the Young Democrats.

== Career ==
Muenster was a businesswoman and a self-employed historic property renovator.

She began her political career serving on the Vermillion, South Dakota city council. She was elected to serve in the South Dakota Senate in 1984 as a representative of the fifteenth district in northern Sioux Falls. She was reelected in 1986 and in 1988, serving in the senate from 1985 to 1992. She was appointed to the executive board of the Legislative Research Council in 1987 and was elected Democratic minority whip in 1988. She served on the state affairs, judiciary, and commerce committees.

Muenster was a member of the 1986 National Democratic Policy Commission, served as precinct committeewoman of the National Democratic Women's Club, and was a board member of the Civic Fine Arts Board.

== Personal life and death ==
Muenster married Theodore R. "Ted" Muenster Jr., a native of Beatrice, Nebraska whom she met in college, and moved with him to South Dakota in 1967. They lived in Vermillion, Pierre and Sioux Falls, and had three children, Ted, Tom, and Mary Kathryn.

Muenster died from complications of Alzheimer's disease in Vermillion on April 3, 2026, at the age of 83. Her funeral took place at St. Agnes Catholic Church in Vermillion.

== Legacy ==
In 2009, the Theodore R. and Karen K. Muenster University Center at the University of South Dakota was named in honor of Muenster and her husband for their contributions to the school.
