= Münster (disambiguation) =

Münster is a city in North Rhine-Westphalia, Germany, where the Peace of Westphalia was signed.

Münster or Muenster may also refer to:

== Places ==
- Münster, Tyrol, a town in the district of Kufstein in Austria
- Muenster, Saskatchewan, a village in central Saskatchewan, Canada
- Munster, a province in Ireland

=== France ===
- Munster, Haut-Rhin (Münster im Elsass), a commune in the Haut-Rhin department
- Munster, Moselle (Münster in Lothringen), a commune in the Moselle department

=== Germany ===
- Münster (electoral district)
- Münster (region), a Regierungsbezirk of North Rhine-Westphalia, surrounding the city of Münster
- Prince-Bishopric of Münster, a former state of the Holy Roman Empire
- Roman Catholic Diocese of Münster, a bishopric
- Munster, Lower Saxony, a small town in the district of Heidekreis
- Münster, Hesse, a village in the district of Darmstadt-Dieburg
- Münster, Bavaria, a town in the district of Donau-Ries
- FH Münster, a German university in Münster and Steinfurt
- Neumünster, a town in Schleswig-Holstein
- University of Münster

=== Switzerland ===
- Münster (Bern), a Swiss Reformed cathedral in Bern
- Münster, Valais, a village
- Münster-Geschinen, a former municipality
- Münster, the German name of Moutier, canton of Bern
- Münster or Müstair, a village in Val Müstair, Inn, Graubünden

=== United States ===
- Munster, Indiana
- Muenster, Texas

== Other uses ==
- Münster (surname), German-language surname
- Münster (church), an honorific title given to particular churches in German-speaking regions
- Munster cheese, a French cheese
- Muenster cheese, an American cheese
- Treaty of Münster (disambiguation), two treaties signed in 1648

== See also ==
- Munster (disambiguation)
- Münsterland Giro, a bicycle race
- Münsterländer (disambiguation), two breeds of dog
- Münsterlingen, a village in the canton of Thurgau, Switzerland
- Münstertal, Black Forest, a village in Germany
- Bad Münstereifel, a spa town in the Eifel region of Germany
- Beromünster, Luzern
