= St. Trudpert's Abbey =

Coordinates: 47°51′50″N 7°48′12″E

Kloster St. Trudpert's Abbey, Münstertal

St. Trudpert's Abbey (Kloster St. Trudpert) is a former Benedictine monastery in Münstertal in the southern Black Forest, Baden-Württemberg, Germany, now the principal house of the Sisters of St. Joseph of St. Trudpert.

== History ==
According to tradition, St. Trudpert's Abbey originated with Saint Trudpert, an Irish missionary and martyr in the southern Black Forest in the first half of the 7th century. He established a hermitage in Münstertal which became a monastery in the 9th century, and which by, at the latest, 900 had expanded to a monastic community supported by the influential noble family of the Liutfride. It is recorded that relics of Trudpert were translated to the abbey in 901 and shortly after 965.

The abbey's development during the next few centuries seems to have been peaceful: no involvement either in ecclesiastical reform or in the Investiture Controversy is recorded. The community's estates lay principally in the Münstertal, the Breisgau, the Ortenau and in Alsace. It also acquired the lordship of Tunsel and the parishes of Münstertal, Grunern, Krozingen, Tunsel, Laufen, Biengen and others.

The abbey was also able to capitalise on the silver-mining industry that developed in the region in the later Middle Ages, on the basis of which the small town of Münster grew up below the abbey. In 1346, together with the castle of Burg Scharfenstein, a property of the Staufer (see below), it was destroyed by armed men from Freiburg, and shortly afterwards flooded, from which disasters it never recovered, and was abandoned. The monastery in turn suffered an economic decline in the latter half of the 14th century, apparently during the time of abbot Paul I (1435-1455). In 1525 St. Trudpert's was plundered during the German Peasants' War. In 1632 it was destroyed by the Swedes during the Thirty Years' War.

Around 1200 the lords of Staufen (de:Staufen (Adelsgeschlecht)), ministeriales of the dukes of Zähringen and unrelated to the Hohenstaufen, acquired Vogtrechte (rights of advocacy or stewardship) over St. Trudpert's. The monastery reacted by the production of forged documents purporting to establish a higher Vogtei of the Counts, later Dukes, of Habsburg, with the consequence that until their extinction in 1601 the Staufer functioned as under-Vögte of the Habsburgs. The Habsburg over-Vogtei also meant that the abbey became part of the lordship of Vorderösterreich and thus a Habsburg monastery. As such it was secularised in 1806 and became part of the Grand Duchy of Baden.

Several medieval church and monastery buildings are evidenced, for example a rebuilding of the monastery in 902, and again (possibly after an attack by the Hungarians at the beginning of the 10th century) at some time before 962.

== Buildings ==
The basilica, with three aisles, was extended by the addition of a westwork in about 1100; in the 15th century new monastic buildings were constructed, as well as a Gothic long choir (Langchor). After the destruction of the claustral buildings by the Swedes in 1632 there followed an interim rebuild, which made way for the Baroque new build between 1712 and 1716. The unparalleled stucco work on the high altar was created by Johann Joseph Christian when his son Karl Anton Christian (1731–1810) became abbot here.

Two crosses in niello work from the 13th century have been preserved. From the monastery library comes a manuscript of the second half of the 14th century containing the "St. Trudperter Hohelied", the "first book of German mysticism", as it is sometimes known, a Lower Alemannic German text from the 12th century.

== Sisters of St. Joseph of St. Trudpert ==
The Sisters of St. Joseph of St. Trudpert took over the premises in 1919-1920 after their expulsion from Alsace and have undertaken major construction work not only on the monastic buildings themselves but also on hospital and other medical building projects.

== Abbots of St. Trudpert to 1543 ==
- Humbertus (provost? abbot?) (833 or 878 ?)
- Walderich (abbot) (902)
- Adalbero (provost) (968)
- Eberhard (abbot) (1144-1156)
- R. (1181)
- Hugo (1184-1189?)
- Heinrich I (1186-1215)
- Konrad (1216-1242)
- Absolon (1242)
- Werner I (1246-1288)
- Werner II (1288-1302)
- Bertold (1302-1310)
- Heinrich II (1310-1319)
- Werner III (1319-1354?)
- Nikolaus I (1363?-1384)
- Diethelm von Staufen (1384-1410)
- Ulrich (1411)
- Konrad Löser (1412-1432)
- Paul I (1435-1455)
- Nikolaus II Zeller (1455-1483)
- Rudolf Schmidlin (1484-1487)
- Othmar Arnold (1487-1505)
- Ägidius (1505-1510)
- Martin I Gyr (1510-1526)
- Martin II Löffler (1529-1543)
- [...]

== Sources ==
- Buhlmann, Michael, 2004. Benediktinisches Mönchtum im mittelalterlichen Schwarzwald. Ein Lexikon. Vortrag beim Schwarzwaldverein St. Georgen e. V., St. Georgen im Schwarzwald, 10. November 2004, Tl. 1: A-M, Tl. 2: N-Z (= Vertex Alemanniae, H.10/1-2), pp. 84f. St. Georgen.
- Mangold, Klaus, 2003. Das Kreuz aus St. Trudpert in Münstertal, Schwarzwald, in der Staatlichen Ermitage St. Petersburg. Munich: Hirmer. ISBN 3-7774-9910-2.
- Quarthal, Franz (ed.), 1976. Die Benediktinerklöster in Baden-Württemberg (= Germania Benedictina, vol. 5), pp. 606–613. Ottobeuren.
- Sebert, Werner, 1962. Die Benediktinerabtei St. Trudpert im Münstertal. Karlsruhe, Technische Hochschule: dissertation.
