= Johann Joseph Christian =

German sculptor

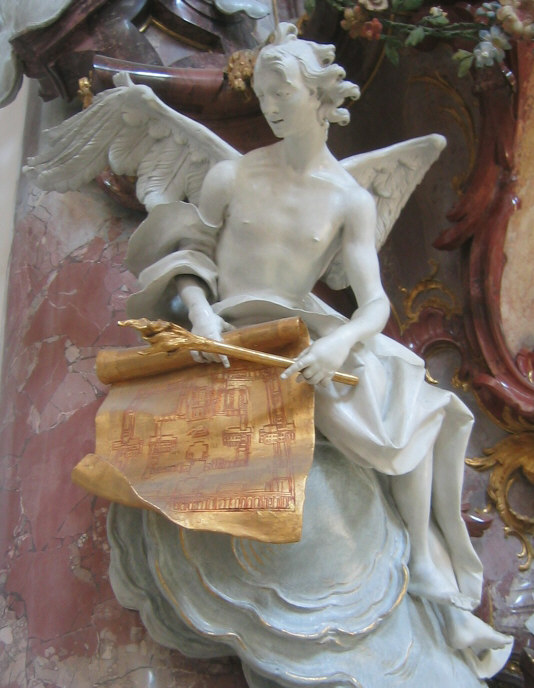
Angel in Zwiefalten Abbey

Johann Joseph Christian (12 February 1706 – 22 June 1777) was a German Baroque sculptor and woodcarver. His masterworks are considered to be the choir stalls in Zwiefalten Abbey and Ottobeuren Abbey. He was one of the few sculptors to work with wood, stone and stucco; and remains "the most important and versatile sculptor of the late Baroque period in Swabia."

== Life ==
Christian was born in Riedlingen, in Further Austria (present-day Baden-Württemberg) to Johann Melchior Christian and his wife Anna Maria Walz. His father was a teacher. His parents had recently moved to Riedlingen from Offingen am Bussen, a village attached to Zwiefalten Abbey.

He apprenticed with carver Eucharius Hermann in Biberach. His rare double gift as a woodworker and stucco sculptor was equalled only by Joseph Anton Feuchtmayer.

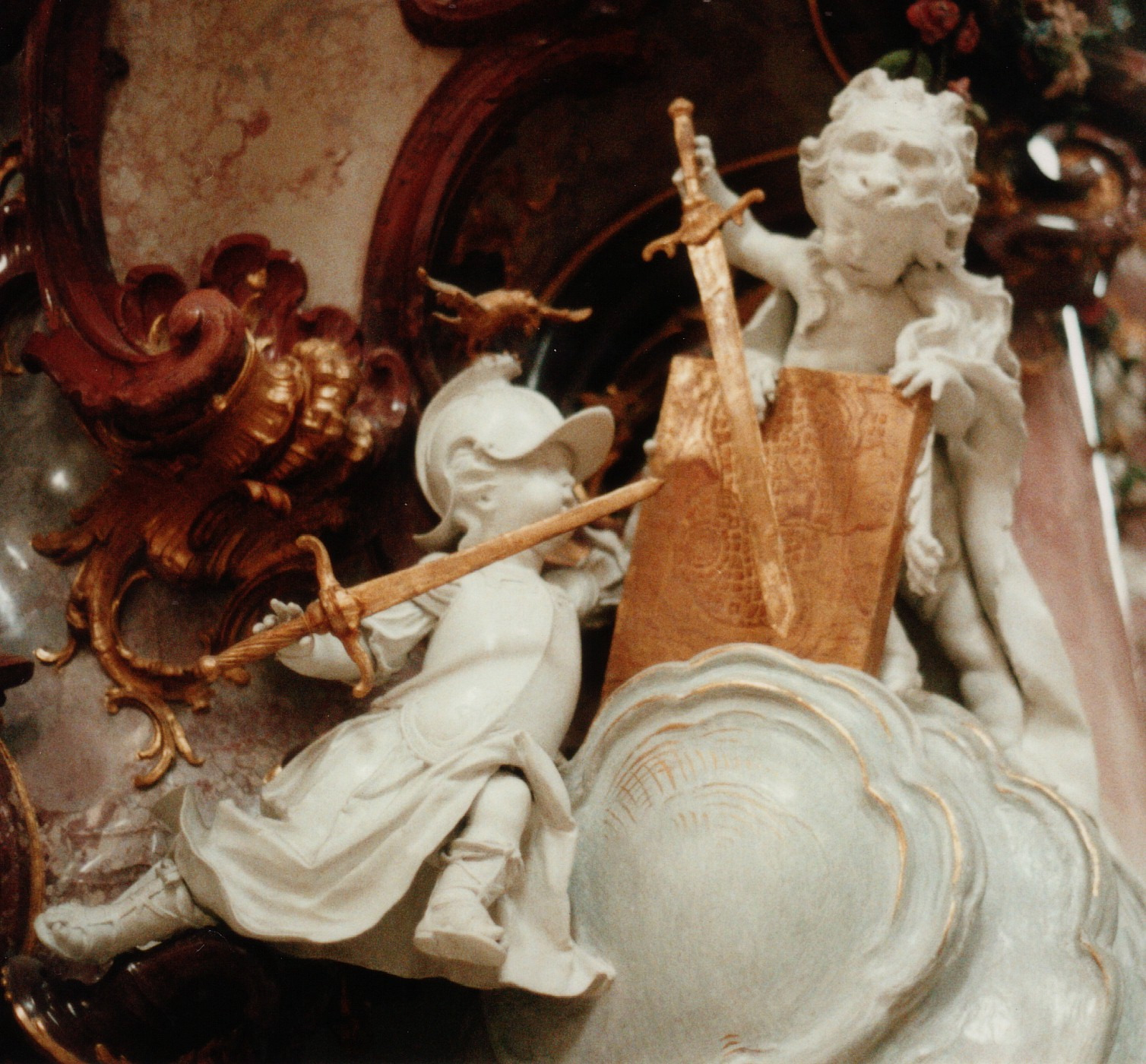
Nebuchadnezzar fighting King Zedekiah, who holds a plan of Jerusalem, in Zwiefalten Abbey

In 1731 he received an order for the Wilflinger church from the Prince Bishop of Constance Franz von Stauffenberg. In 1744 Christian received a commission to work in Zwiefalten Abbey, where until 1755 he created the choir stalls and numerous stucco figures for the high altar and nave and side chapels, working alongside the painter Franz Joseph Spiegler and the stucco master Johann Michael Feuchtmayer and under the direction of the architect Johann Michael Fischer. He also sculpted the stone figures on the west facade. It was here that Christian learned stucco sculpting from Feuchtmayer.

The work at Zwiefalten led to a recommendation to decorate the collegial church at Mehrerau Abbey.

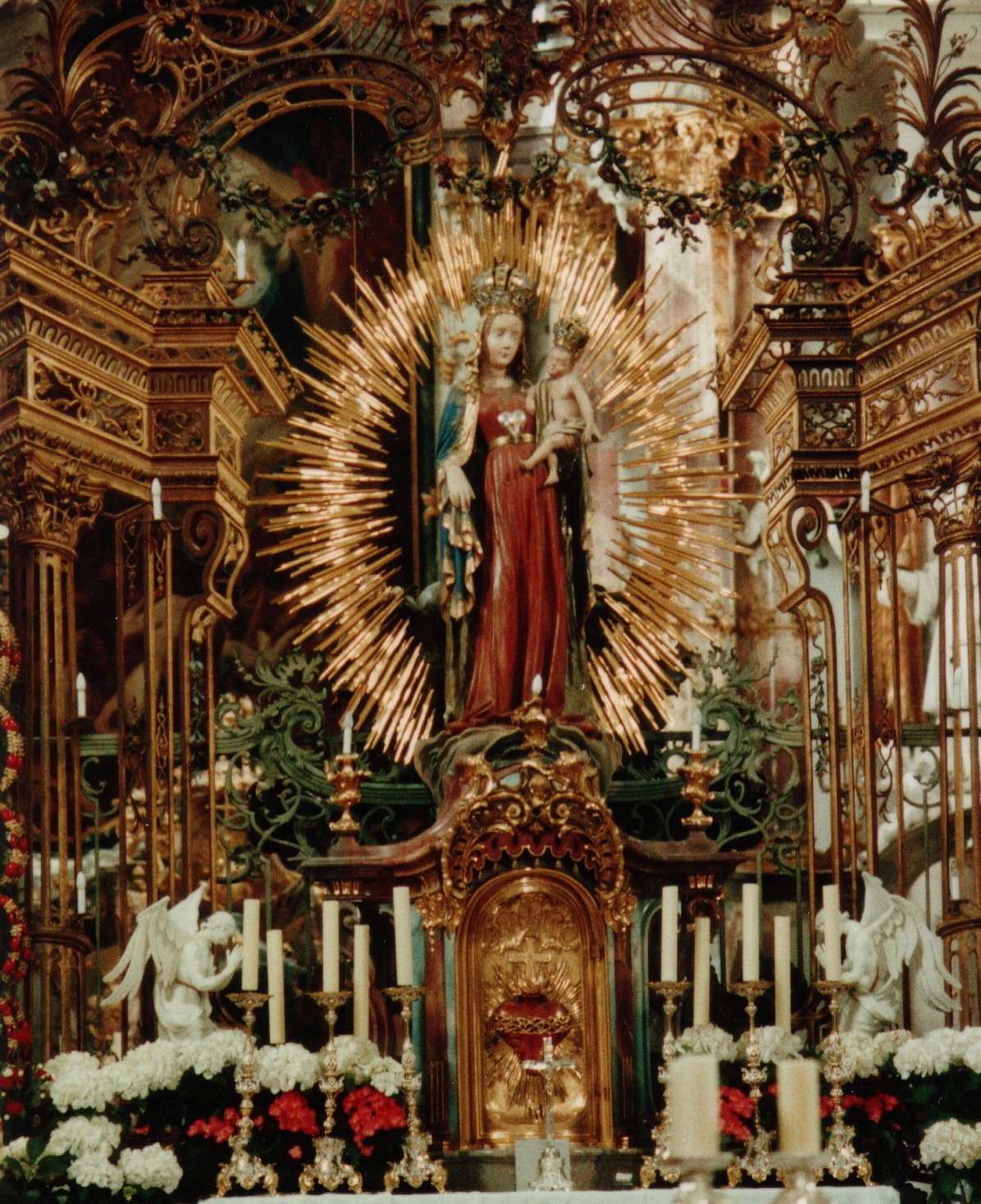
The high altar in Zwiefalten Abbey, combining a Gothic statue of Mary (1430) with Baroque additions by Christian (ca. 1750)

Subsequently, Christian was commissioned to work on the abbatial church of the Holy Trinity in Ottobeuren Abbey, for which the architect was once again Fischer and for which Christian created the choir stalls, with gilded reliefs, and the organ reliefs. Once again he worked with Spiegler and J. M. Feuchtmayer.

Besides these two major works, he also worked on various smaller projects, including the parish church in Unlingen and the abbey church in Buchau.

Christian and his wife, Maria Jacobine Rosine Wocher, had 10 children, of whom five survived infancy. His son Karl Anton Christian (1731–1810) became abbot of St. Trudpert's Abbey near Münstertal in the Black Forest, and for this church J. J. Christian created a relief painting using a stucco technique for the high altar that is considered unparalleled. Christian died in Riedlingen. Another son, Franz Joseph Christian (1739–1798), became a sculptor and took over his father's workshop in Riedlingen.

In 2006, on the occasion of the 300th birthday of the Christian, the Riedlingen Museum presented a large and widely acclaimed exhibition of some of his works. In conjunction with the exhibition, a wall calendar depicting some of his works was made available to attendees.

== Major works ==
- Münstertal—St. Trudpert's Abbey (high altar)
- Ottobeuren—Ottobeuren Abbey, church of the Holy Trinity, (choir stalls and organ reliefs)
- Wiblingen Abbey—church of St. Martin (choir stalls, created along with his son Franz Joseph)
- Zwiefalten—Zwiefalten Abbey (choir stalls, high altar, and almost all other sculpture)
