= Schlatt =

jschlatt (born 1999) is an American Internet personality.

Schlatt may refer to:

- Schlatt (Bad Krozingen), a village in Breisgau-Hochschwarzwald, Baden-Württemberg, Germany
- Schlatt (landform), the Lower Saxon name for a heathland pond
- Schlatt, Austria, a municipality in Vöcklabruck, Upper Austria, Austria
- Schlatt, Thurgau, a municipality in Frauenfeld, Thurgau, Switzerland
- Schlatt, Zurich, a municipality in Winterthur, Zürich, Switzerland
- Schlatt-Haslen, a district of Appenzell Innerrhoden, Switzerland
