= Bad Krozingen =

- Town
- Town hall

- Flag Coat of arms

- Location of Bad Krozingen within Breisgau-Hochschwarzwald district
- Interactive map of Bad Krozingen
- Location within Germany Location within Baden-Württemberg
- Coordinates: 47°55′N 7°42′E
- Country: Germany
- State: Baden-Württemberg
- Admin. region: Freiburg
- District: Breisgau-Hochschwarzwald

Government
  - Mayor (2021–29): Volker Kieber

Area
  - Total: 35.69 km^{2} (13.78 sq mi)
- Elevation: 250 m (820 ft)

Population (2025-12-31)
  - Total: 21,620
  - Density: 605.8/km^{2} (1,569/sq mi)
- Time zone: UTC+01:00 (CET)
  - Summer (DST): UTC+02:00 (CEST)
- Postal codes: 79189
- Dialling codes: 07633
- Vehicle registration: FR
- Website: www.bad-krozingen.de

Bad Krozingen (German: [baːt ˈkʁɔtsɪŋən]; Alemannic: Bad Chrotzige) is a spa town in the district Breisgau-Hochschwarzwald, in Baden-Württemberg, Germany. It is situated 15 km southwest of Freiburg. In the 1970s, the previously independent villages Biengen, Hausen an der Möhlin, Schlatt and Tunsel, including Schmidhofen, became part of Bad Krozingen.

== Geography ==
=== Location ===
Bad Krozingen is located in Breisgau, about 15 km southwest of Freiburg and 45 km north of Basel, surrounded by corn and tobacco fields. Together with Staufen the town forms a middle-order centre. The river Neumagen flows through the town, then into the Möhlin near Biengen, which flows into the Rhine at Breisach.

=== Neighbouring towns ===
The neighbouring towns, clockwise from the north, include Breisach am Rhine, Munzigen, a district of Freiburg, Schallstadt, Ehrenkirchen, Staufen im Breisgau, Heitersheim, Eschbach and Hartheim.

The towns Biengen, Hausen an der Möhlin, Schlatt and Tunsel, which were independent until before the Community Reform in Baden-Württemberg in the 1970s, belong to Bad Krozingen. The four districts are localities in accordance with the municipal code of Baden-Württemberg, each having its own town council and a local mayor.

- The towns Kems and Oberkrozingen also belong to Bad Krozingen.
- Biengen was first mentioned in documents in the year 770 in the Lorsch codex and incorporated into Bad Krozingen in 1971. Weiler, Dottighofen and the village of Innighofen belong to Biengen.
- Hausen an der Möhlin, first mentioned in documents in 1147, became part of Bad Krozingen in 1973.
- Schlatt was first mentioned in documents in 1130. The Order of St. John in Heitersheim acquired Schlatt in 1371. In 1973 it became part of Bad Krozingen.
- Tunsel, first mentioned in documents in 852 (elsewhere specified 860), became part of Bad Krozingen in 1974. Burghöfe, Schmidhofen and the village of Muttikofen belong to Tunsel.

== History ==
There are some finds (storage vessel and trapezoidal stone axe) which indicate that the area has been populated since the Neolithic. The Celts and Merovingians populated the area in the pre-Christian age and way past that. Open-field, river and place names, such as Neumagen, Möhlin, Kems, Tunsel, Belchen or Rhine, attest to that to the present day.

In the mid-1st century A.D. the Romans conquered the south-west of the present day area. Remains of a Roman road station, parts of pottery with kilns, a Roman fountain and foundations of several estates were founded in the following years. The Alemanni lived here from the 4th century. The oldest evidence of an Alemannic settlement includes graves at the former Roman road station and in the burial ground "Unterer Stollen" with 204 burials. Judging by the rich burial gifts, it was occupied between 500 and 700 A.D. Krozingen was mentioned for the first time in documents in the books of the monastery of St. Gallen as "Scrozzinga" in the year 808 A.D., probably named after the family of the Alemannic nobleman Crozzo. The town originated from the old center Oberkrozingen, Kems and Unterkrozingen as an Alemannic village at the junction of the Roman road Basel-Offenburg on the Neumagen.

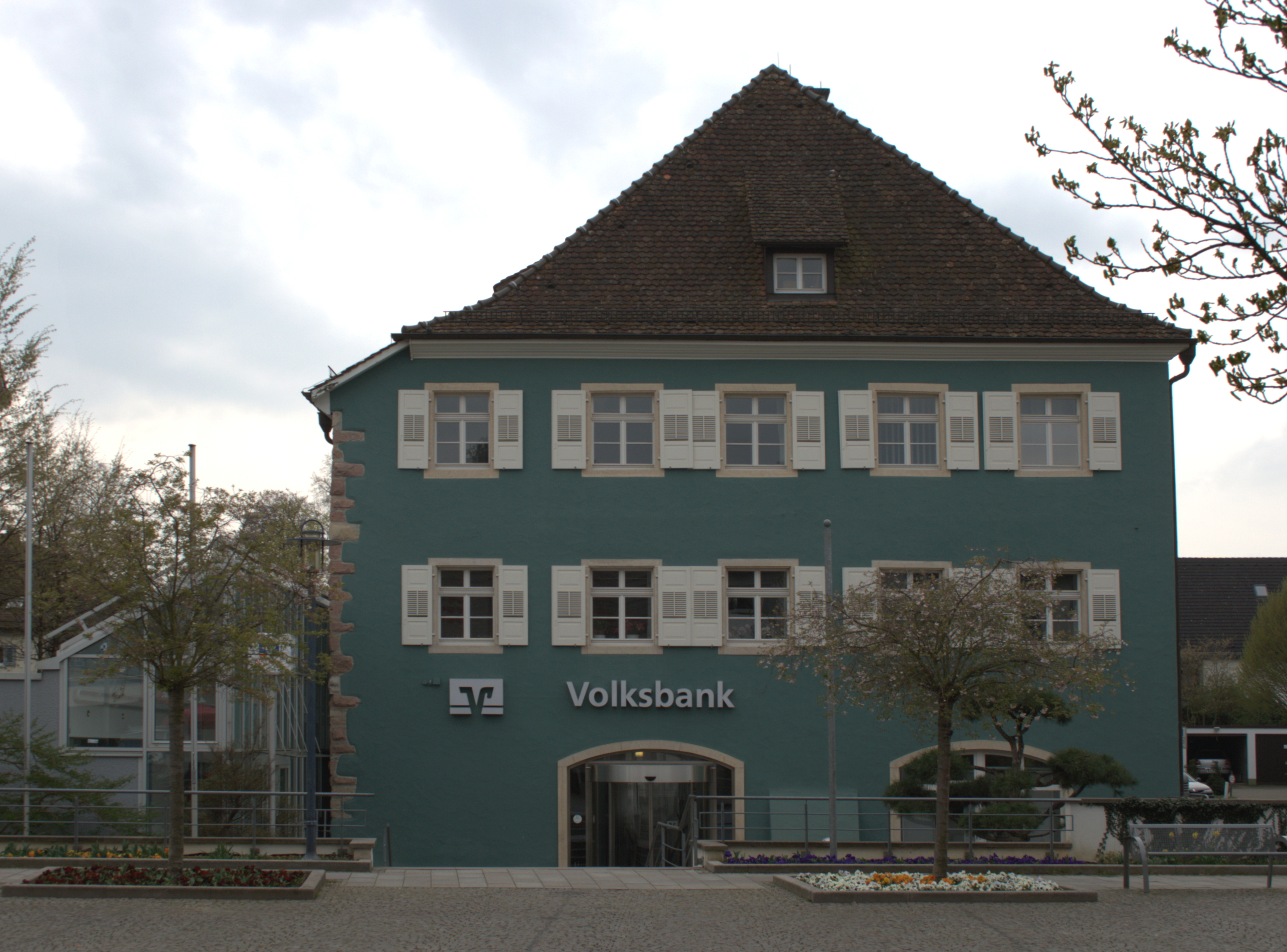
The Pfirt castle

Krozingen was part of the Breisgau district of Further Austria until it was transferred to the Electorate of Baden in Peace of Pressburg in 1805 and it had different overlords. Schnewlin von Landeck, the lords of Schauenburg and the lords of Pfirt are among these. The former Pfirt castle, where the lords had their seat and which currently is the Volksbank building, was named after them.

Thermal water was found in 1911 when searching for oil, which was thought to be present in Upper Rhine Plain. This finding was crucial to Krozingen as a future spa town. In 1933, after further drilling and starting a health spa business, Krozingen was given the title "Bad" (bath). A modern spa house was completed in 1959.

The towns Biengen, Hausen an der Möhlin, Schlatt and Tunsel, which were independent until the administrative reform in the 1970s, became part of Bad Krozingen in 1972 and 1973. The former district of Müllheim became the newly created district Breisgau-Hochschwarzwald. Bad Krozingen became a city on September 1, 2005 – the community, with about 16,000 inhabitants, had become the second largest municipality in the district.

== Politics ==
=== Municipal Council ===
Following the local election on May 25, 2015, with a turnout of 48.09 % (+ 1.69) the seats in the municipal council of Bad Krozingen were distributed as follows:

Partei/Liste	Stimmenanteil	G/V	Sitze	G/V
CDU	37.67 %	− 6.33	10	− 2
Bad Krozinger Bürgerforum (KBF)	17.73 %	− 3.07	5	± 0
SPD	16.27 %	− 0.13	4	± 0
Grüne	15.11 %	+ 15.11	4	+ 4
FDP/Freie Bürgerliste	13.23 %	− 5.57	4	− 1

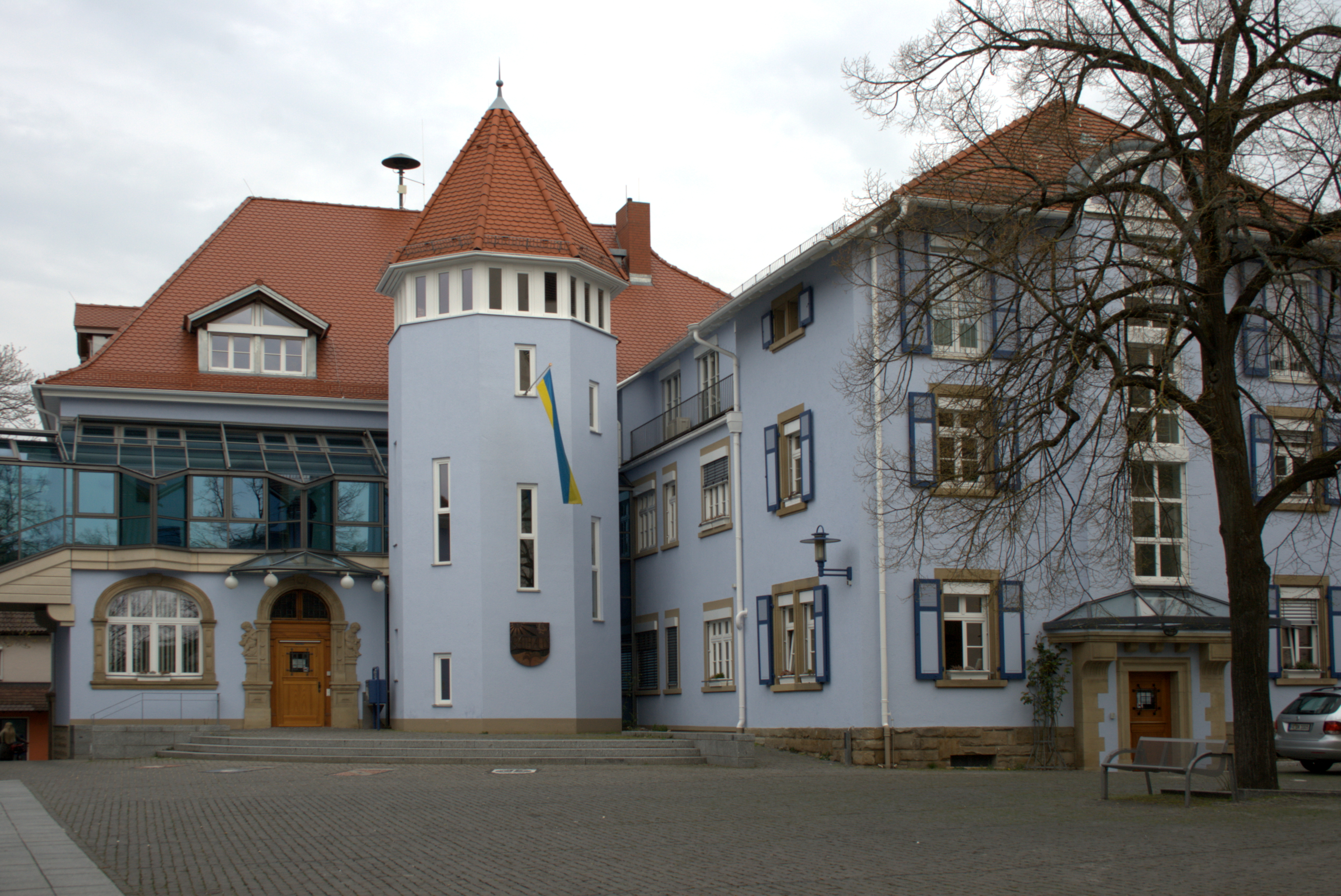
Bad Krozingen town hall

=== Mayor ===
In November 2013, Volker Kieber, formerly the mayor of Gottenheim, was elected to succeed Ekkehart Meroth as mayor. Kieber was educated at the Theodor-Heuss-Gymnasium in Esslingen/N. After passing his A-level exams, he joined the German Airforce for basic military service, and was stationed in Leipheim, Fürstenfeldbruck und Memmingen. From 1983 to 1987, Kieber visited the University for Applied Forest Sciences in Rottenburg/N. and graduated in 1987, receiving a graduate degree in engineering (Diplom-Ingenieur (FH)). Kieber received practical training in the Public Forestry Offices at Trippstadt, Karlsruhe, Welzheim and Gundelsheim/N. From 1988 to 1994, he worked as head of forestry administration in the districts of Waldenburg and Unterheimbach, for the Count of Hohenlohe-Waldenburg (Fürstlichen Forstverwaltung des Fürsten zu Hohenlohe-Waldenburg). In 1994, he changed his position to become the head of the forestry district of Mooswald for the city council of Freiburg im Breisgau. In 2004, Kieber was elected as mayor of the wine-growing municipality Gottenheim am Tuniberg. In 2013, Kieber ran for mayor of Bad Krozingen and was elected by a large majority in the second round of voting. In 2014, Kieber was elected to serve in the district council (Kreistag) of the Landkreises Breisgau-Hochschwarzwald. Kieber also serves as a regional council, as well as being a member of the supervisory boards of the University Heart Center Freiburg-Bad Krozingen, the hospitals Theresienklinik I and Theresienklinik II, and the spa and wellness provider Kur- und Bäder GmbH Bad Krozingen.

=== Communal Partnership ===
Bad Krozingen shares a communal partnership (Vereinbarte Verwaltungsgemeinschaft) with the municipality of Hartheim, with Bad Krozingen being the fulfilling municipality, i.e. providing municipal services for members of both communities. Bad Krozingen also chairs the joint committee, which is staffed by three councillors from each of the two partner communities.

=== Coat of Arms ===
Blazon: In blue, above a golden globe, a golden Eye of God, surrounded by golden beams. This surprising emblem bears on the gradual redesign and reinterpretation of the image on the town's old official seal, and town symbol. The oldest known seal of Bad Krozingen has been passed down on a document from 1686. It shows a geometric structure, surrounded by a circumscription of the words "Gemeinde Crotzingen". It may depict the stylised shape of a "Sester" (a vessel used to measure a certain volume unit of grain). This symbol is commonly encountered as a village marker, and can probably be regarded as such in this case as well. A derivation from the wheel in the coat of arms of the local gentry, on the other hand, seems unlikely, as does the interpretation as an arrow inserted into a crossbow (as suggested by Stadler), or even an explanation as the Eye of God floating above the globe. This interpretation of the old seal as the Eye of God above the globe emerged in the 19th century, and the municipality insisted on these symbols and their interpretation when the State Archive presented a draft for a new coat of arms, which was based on the historical symbols. In 1921, the emblem used so far was embellished with the golden beams commonly used in depictions of the Eye of God, and this new version was established as the official coat of arms.

=== Sister Cities ===
- Since 1985, the communities of Gréoux-les-Bains and Esparron-de-Verdon in the south of France have been Sister cities of Bad Krozingen.
- Since 2004, Bad Krozingen has been linked to the community of Naori in Japan. Today's formal partnership was initiated as a city friendship in 1989. Since 2005, Naori is part of the city of Taketa.
- Bad Krozingen also held a city friendship with Bojnice in Slovakia, which was established in 1993. In July 2011, during the Krozinger Lichterfest, an annual festival of lights, the two cities signed the twinning agreement, turning the friendship into an official partnership.

=== Joint Board ===
Bad Krozingen is a member of the Transnational Joint Board Mittelhardt-Oberrhein, an organization established to advance the cooperation between towns and municipalities across the French-German border, in the neighboring regions of Alsace (France) and South Baden (Germany). It is based on the Karlsruher Übereinkommen (Treaty of Karlsruhe).

== Culture and Attractions ==
=== Churches and Chapels ===
- The Catholic Church St. Alban was mentioned for the first time in documents in 1144. The first religious construction in this area was built years before, although it is not known exactly when. On Palm Sunday 2002 a fire heavily damaged the Baroque ceiling and the organ and almost destroyed the high altar. Two years later, the church recovered, the destroyed parts were restored and the division of the high altar was slightly changed.
- After the Protestant Reformation, Kronzingen remained Catholic because it belonged to Further Austria. In 1556 the Reformation spread to Baden. The first Protestant ecclesiastic, Vikar Funk, promoted with enthusiasm the building of the first Protestant church. The Christuskirche was consecrated in 1935 by the regional bishop. A special attraction is the modern church windows designed by Georg Meistermann between 1980 and 1981. They represent the manifestations of God in the world.

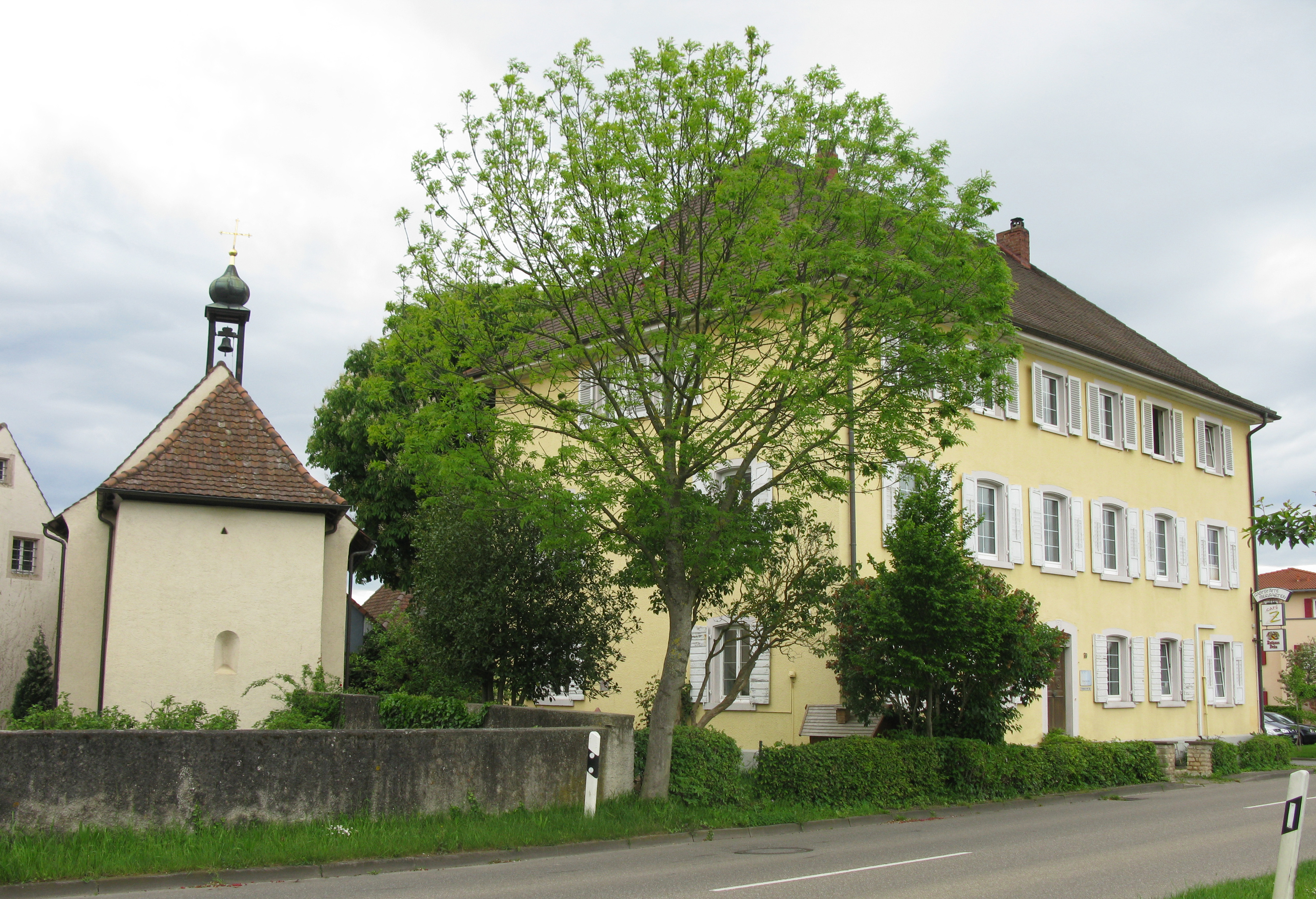
Glöcklehof Chapel and Café Z

- In the Romanic Glöcklehof Chapel, which was built between the 10th and the 11th centuries, there are frescoes with one of the oldest depictions of Jesus north of the Alps.
- In a small private park in the southern area of Bad Kronzingen there is the Renaissance Castle of the Barons of Gliechenstein. It was originally built in 1579 as a residence for the provost of the Benedictine monastery of St. Blasien by Abt Caspar II. In the middle of the 18th century it was renovated by Johann Caspar Bagnato. The 17th-century castle chapel was also rebuilt in the 18th century in the Rococo style. However, nowadays the chapel is not open to the public.
- St. Fridolin's Chapel stands in the middle of a crossroads at the edge of the Kems district. It was probably erected after the Thirty Years' War. The altar was donated by Abbot Martin I of St. Blasien in 1602. In 2014, it was completely renovated and, nowadays, occasionally small concerts take place here.
- The St. Joseph's Chapel stands in a courtyard district that once belonged to the St. Trudpert monastery. The chapel was built, after the secularization, by the first private owners as a thank-you for handing over this piece of land to the court.
Chapels in Bad Krozingen

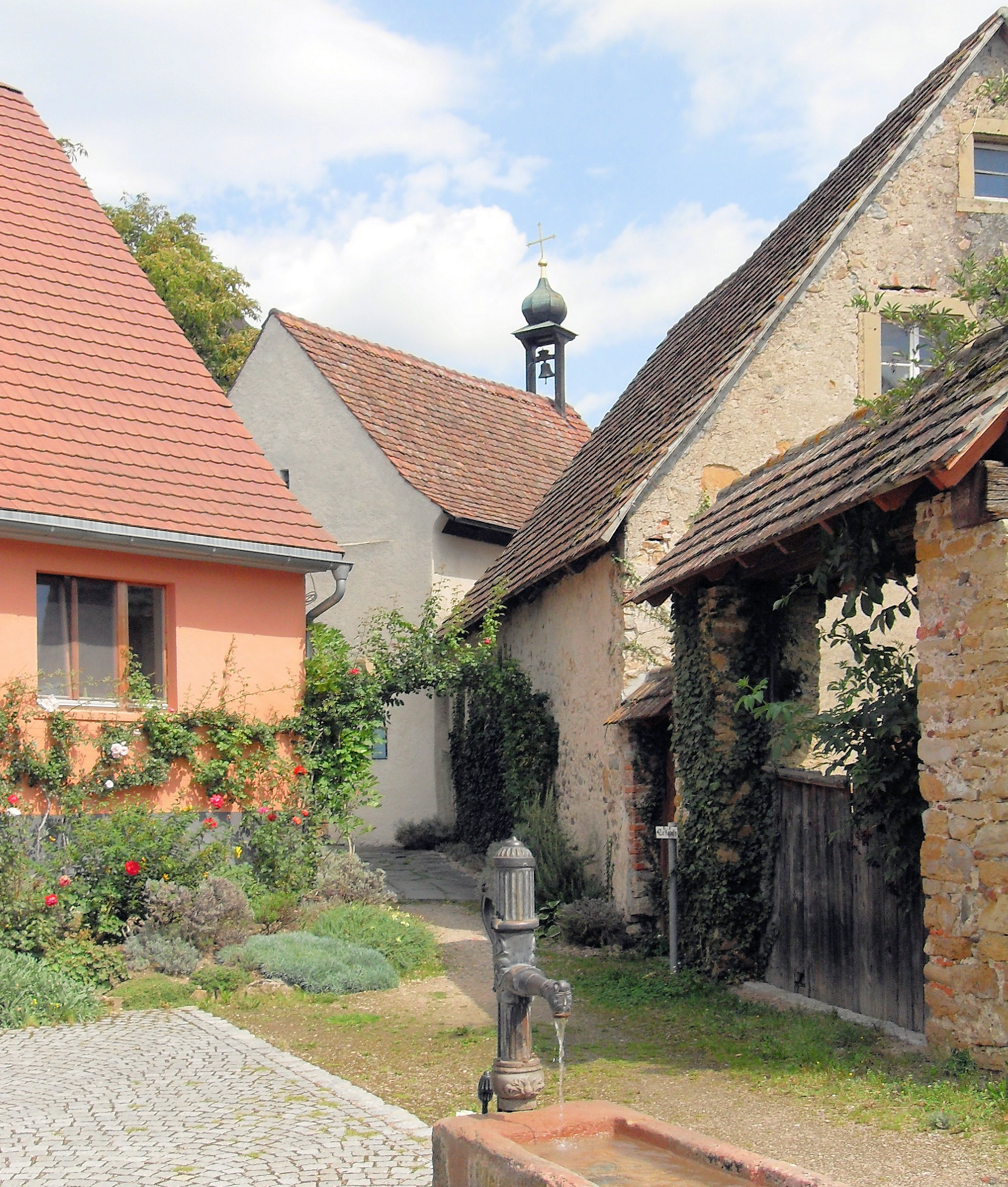
Glöcklehof Chapel

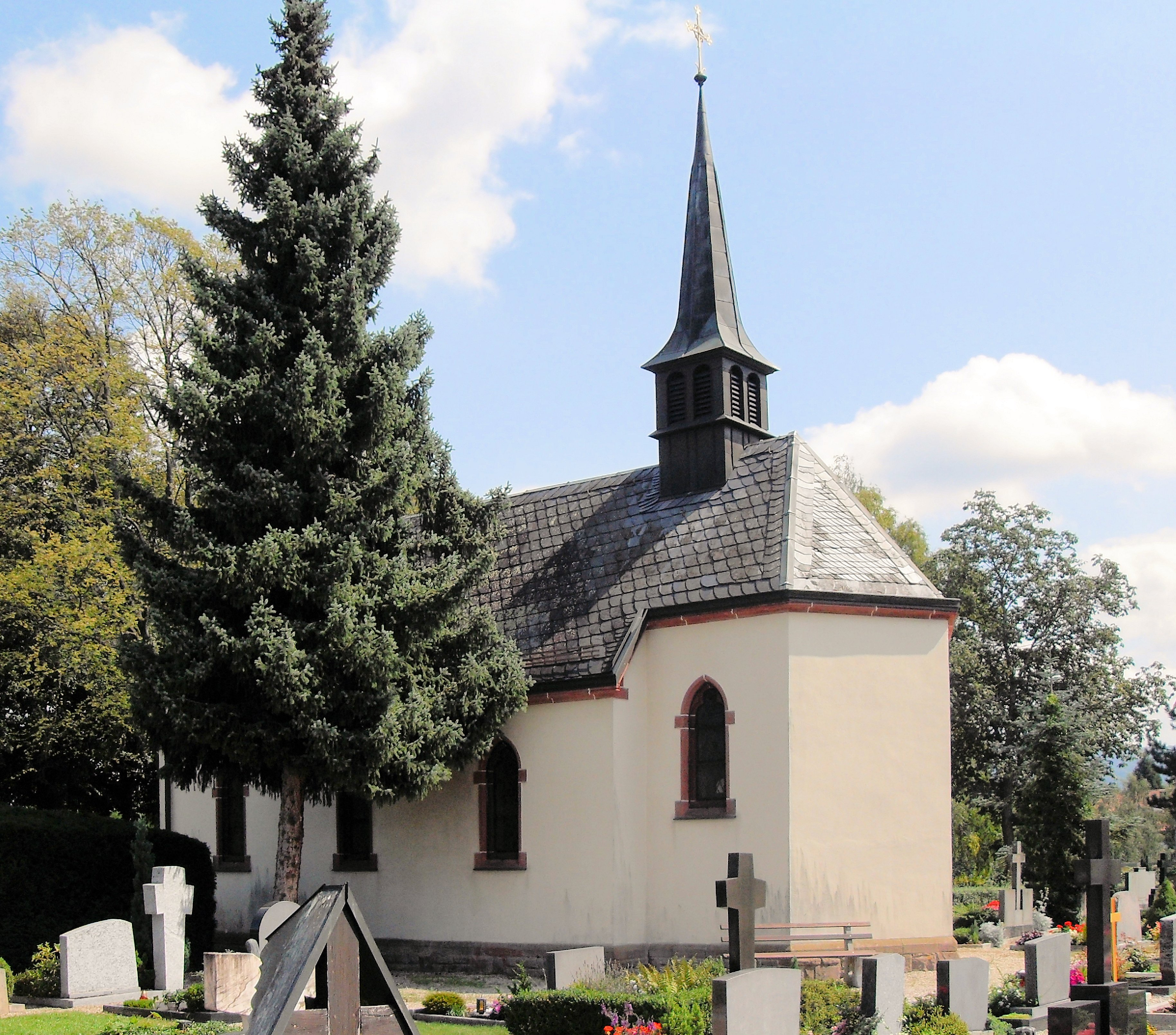
Friedhof Chapel

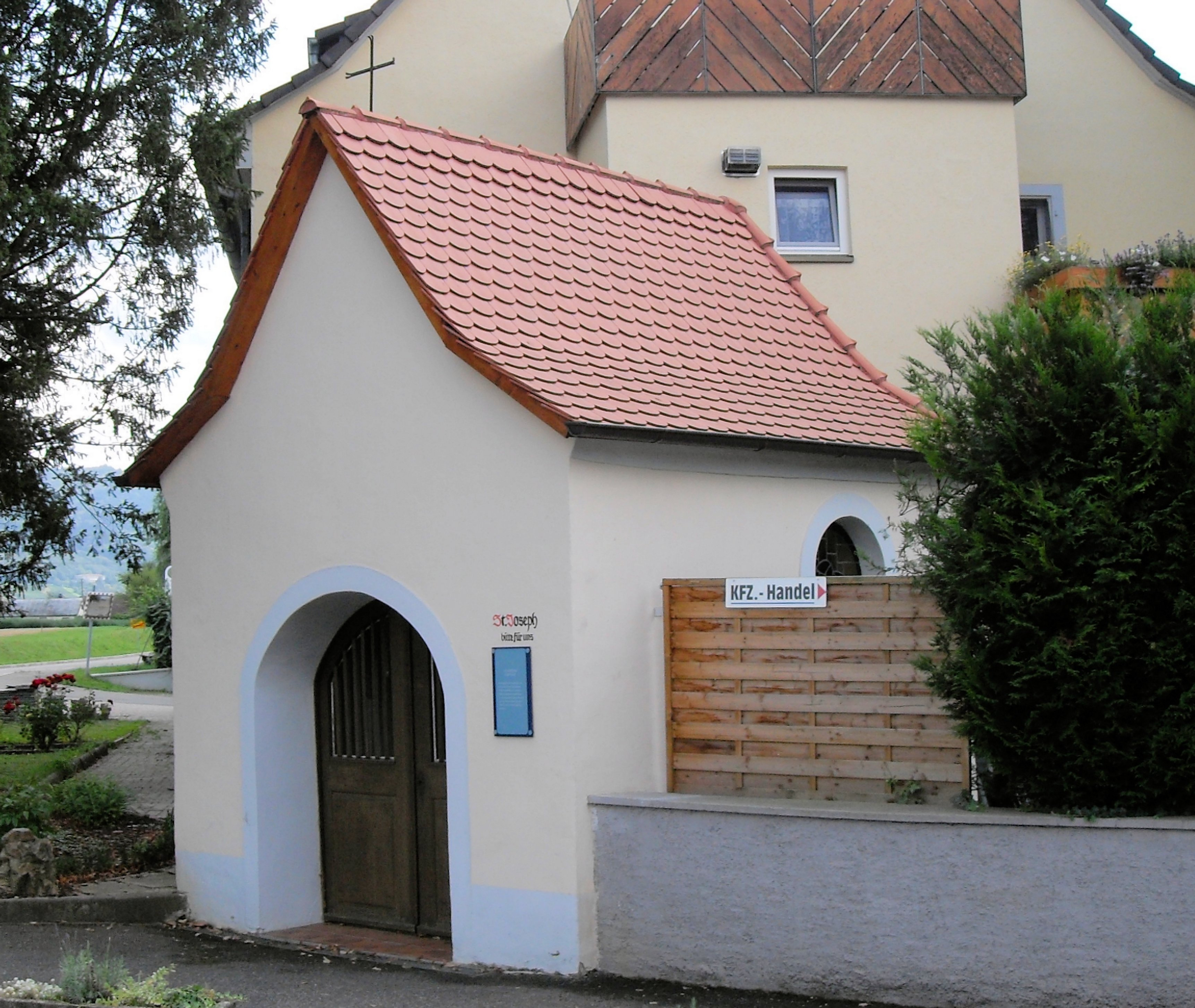
St. Joseph's Chapel in Oberkrozingen

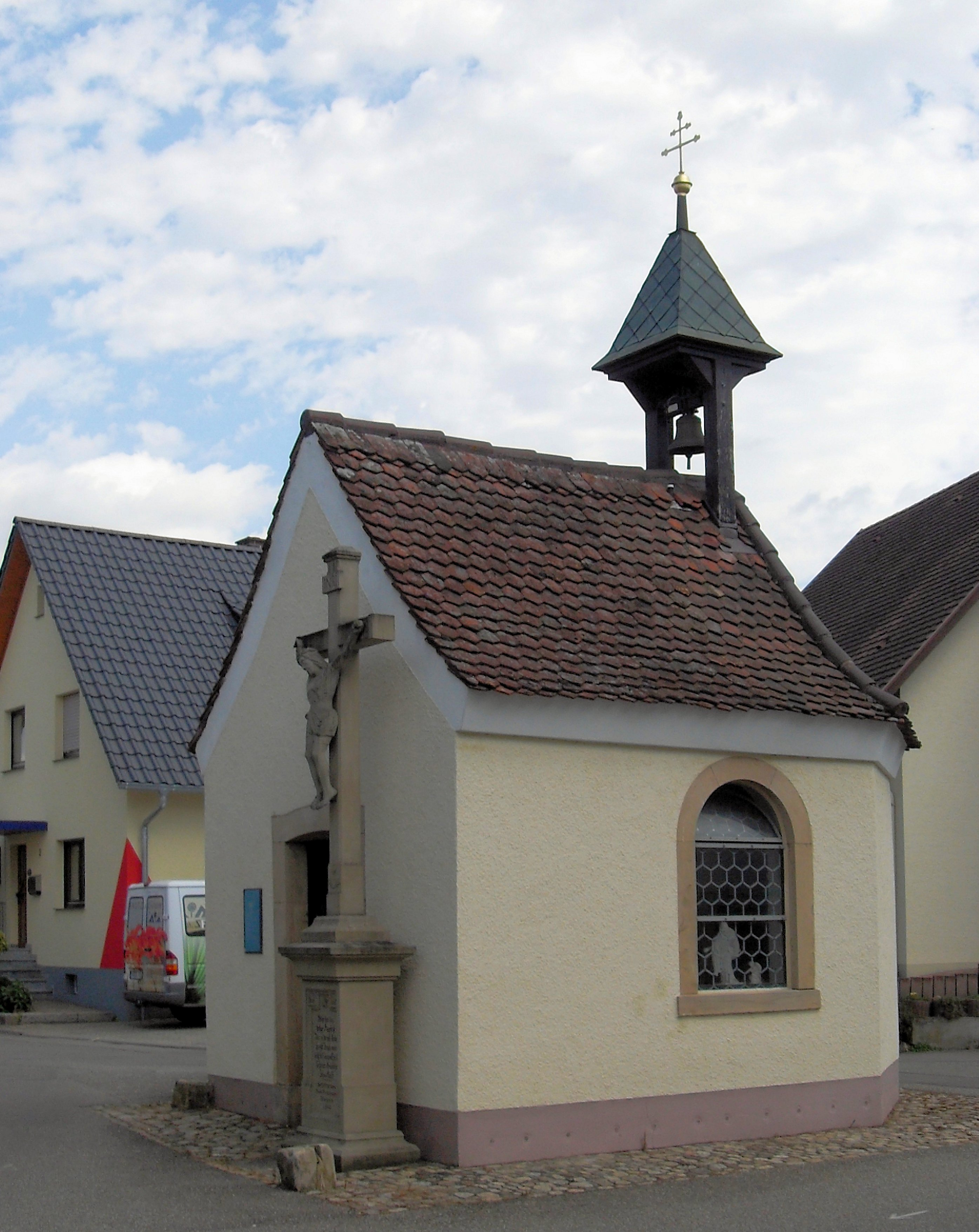
St. Fridolin's Chapel in Kems

=== Museums ===
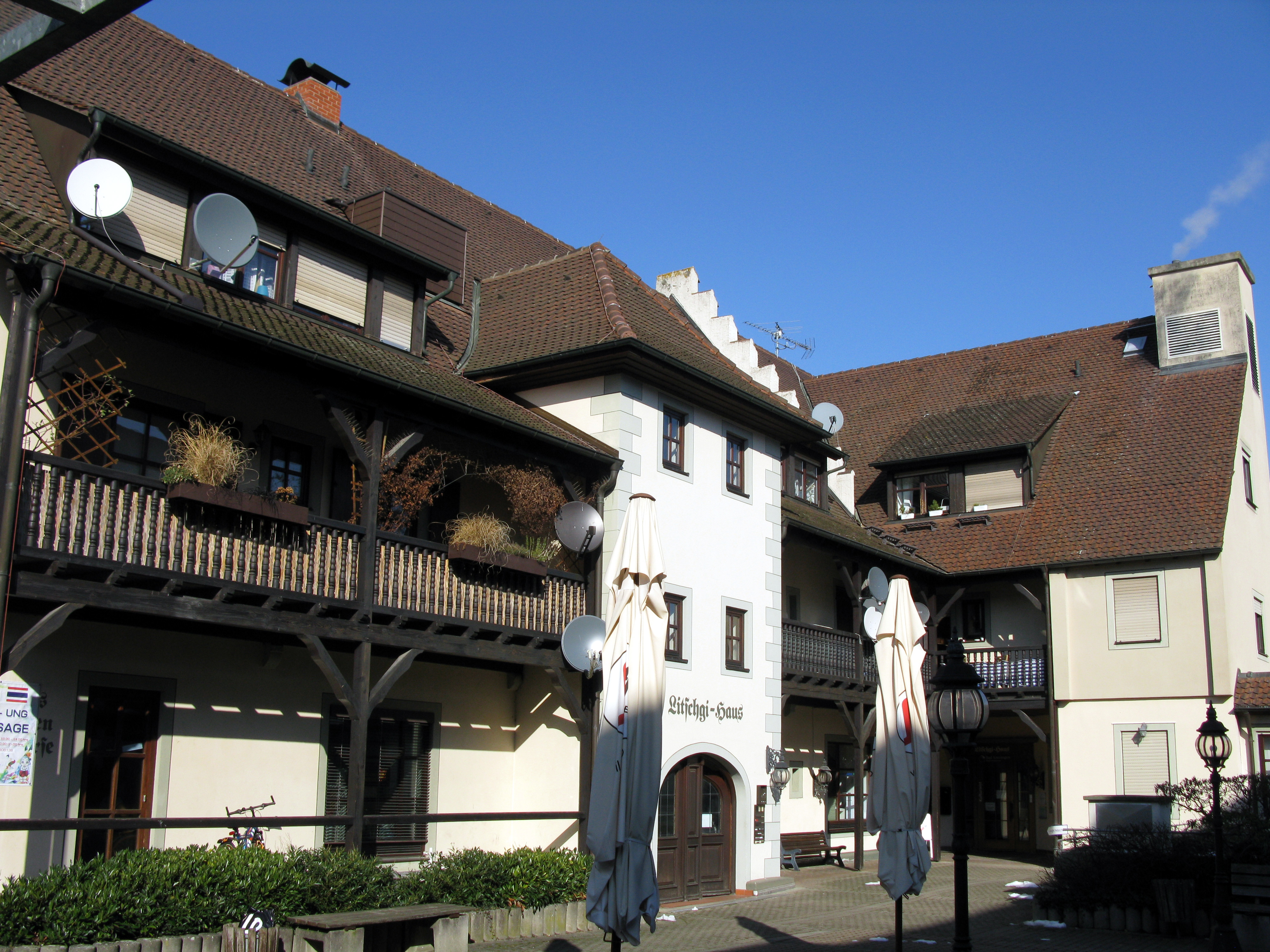
Litschgi-Haus

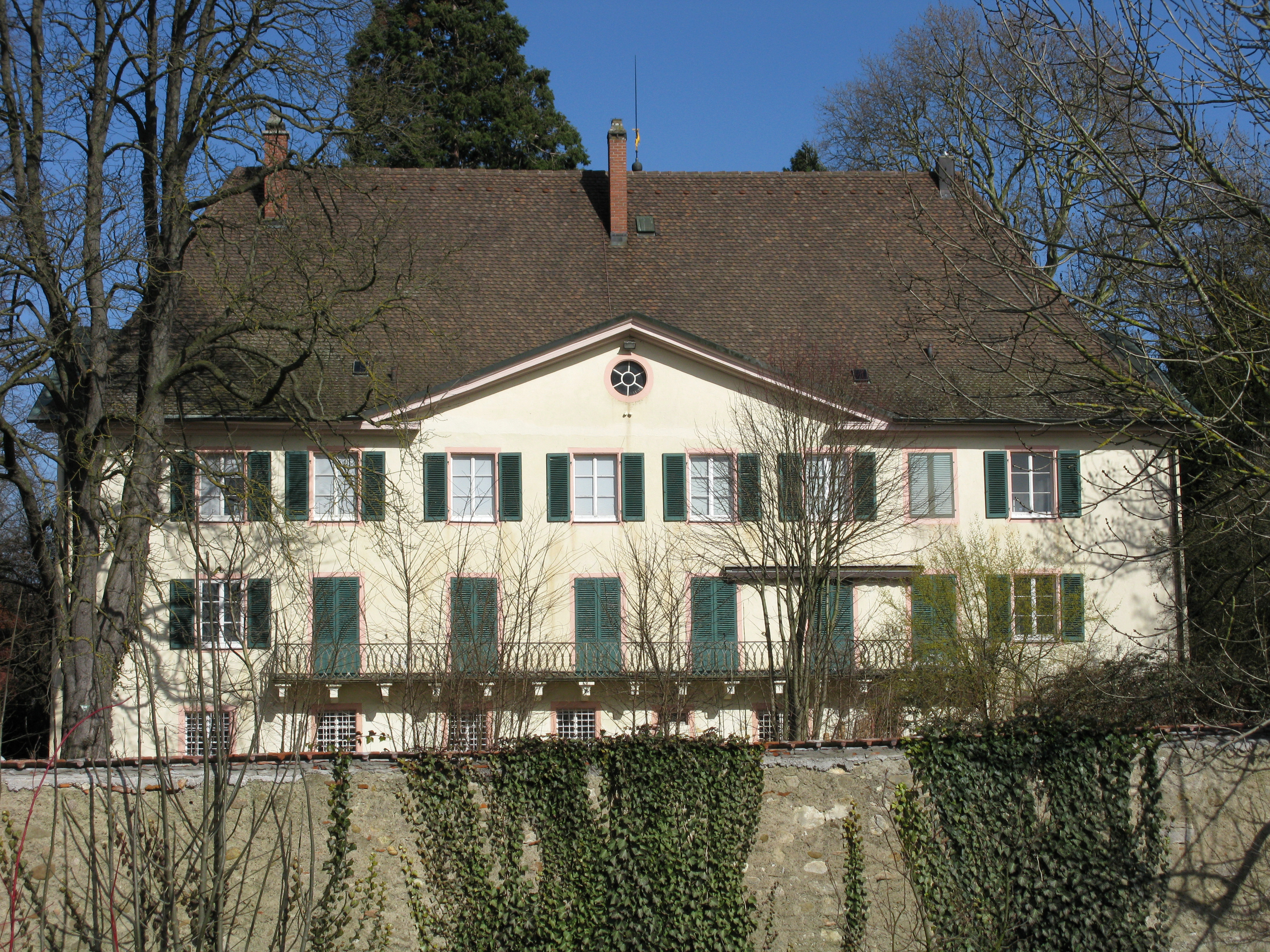
Palace with the collection of historical keyboard instruments

==== Museum in Litschgihaus with an archaeological section ====
The museum has two halls. In the first one, there is a historical museum, which provides an overview of the history from the Paleolithic Age until nowadays. The main focus of the permanent exhibition is on the history of building houses, which is explained through models. On the contrary, the other hall hosts temporary exhibitions. The museum is located on Bundesstraße 3 and is open on Sundays from 2 pm to 5 pm.

==== Collection of historical keyboard instruments Neumeyer-Junghanns-Tracey ====
Since 1974 the Bad Kronzingen Palace hosts a collection of about 50 historical keyboard instruments, that had been collected by the harpsichordist Fritz Neumeyer (1900–1983). Some of these instruments can be heard regularly at the Bad Krozinger Palace concerts, where the entire collection can be seen.

==== Museum in Biengen Town Hall ====
The museum in Biengen Town Hall opened in July 2005 after two years of preparation and a lot of voluntary work. Many citizens work – under the umbrella of the local society Biengen e.V. – on a voluntary basis and in their free time. They give information to the visitors, organise special exhibitions and do the necessary renovation work and structural conversions. The museum wants to give an insight into the everyday history of the people who have been living here for generations.

=== Media Center ===
A public library (media Center) opened in April 2015 near to the train station with 27000 medias about general knowledge, society, culture and science.

=== Litschgikeller / Josefshaus ===
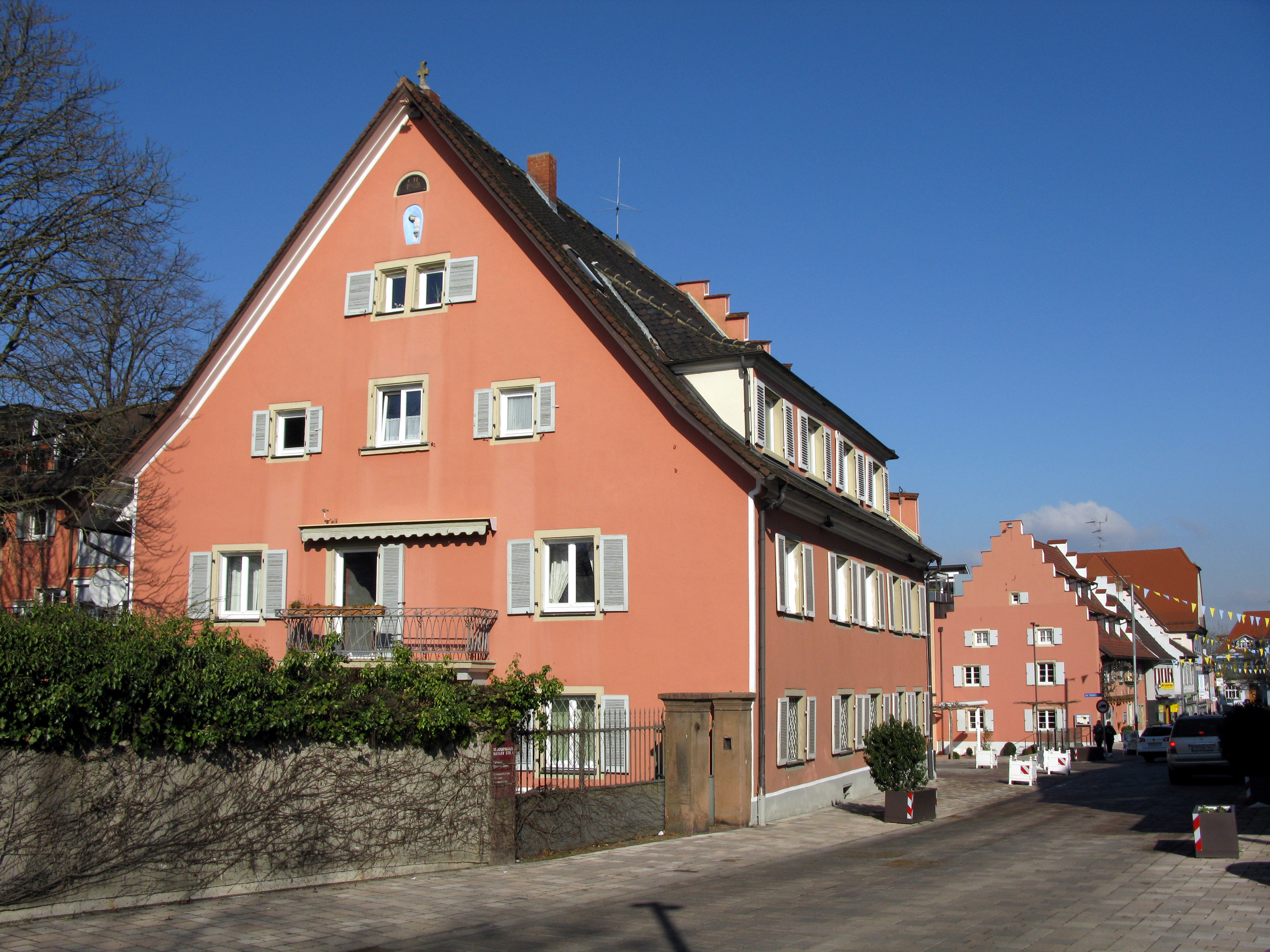
St. Josefshaus

In Litschgihaus take place many types of cultural events such as cabaret, theatre, circus, Stand-up comedy, political cabaret, music and satirical theatre. In addition, there is a chamber-music series called „Piano & Mehr“. The centre of the stage is a Bechsteinflügel piano, which is played in different combinations with other instruments or with a singer.

=== JOKI Cinema at the train station ===
JOKI Cinema was built in October 2002. Before the opening in the station on March 26, 2015, the shows used to take place in St. Josefshaus with a 35 mm projector and a large screen. Nowadays all the shows take place in the Media Center basement at the train station. The cinema is run by the society Joki-Kino e.V..The city and the Baden-Württemberg Media and Film Fund supported the construction of the new cinema in the new location Bahnhofstrasse 3b and support the company. There films are shown daily, except for Wednesdays. The cinema has 112 seats and three wheelchair places.

== Gallery ==
Sankt Albans (Day)

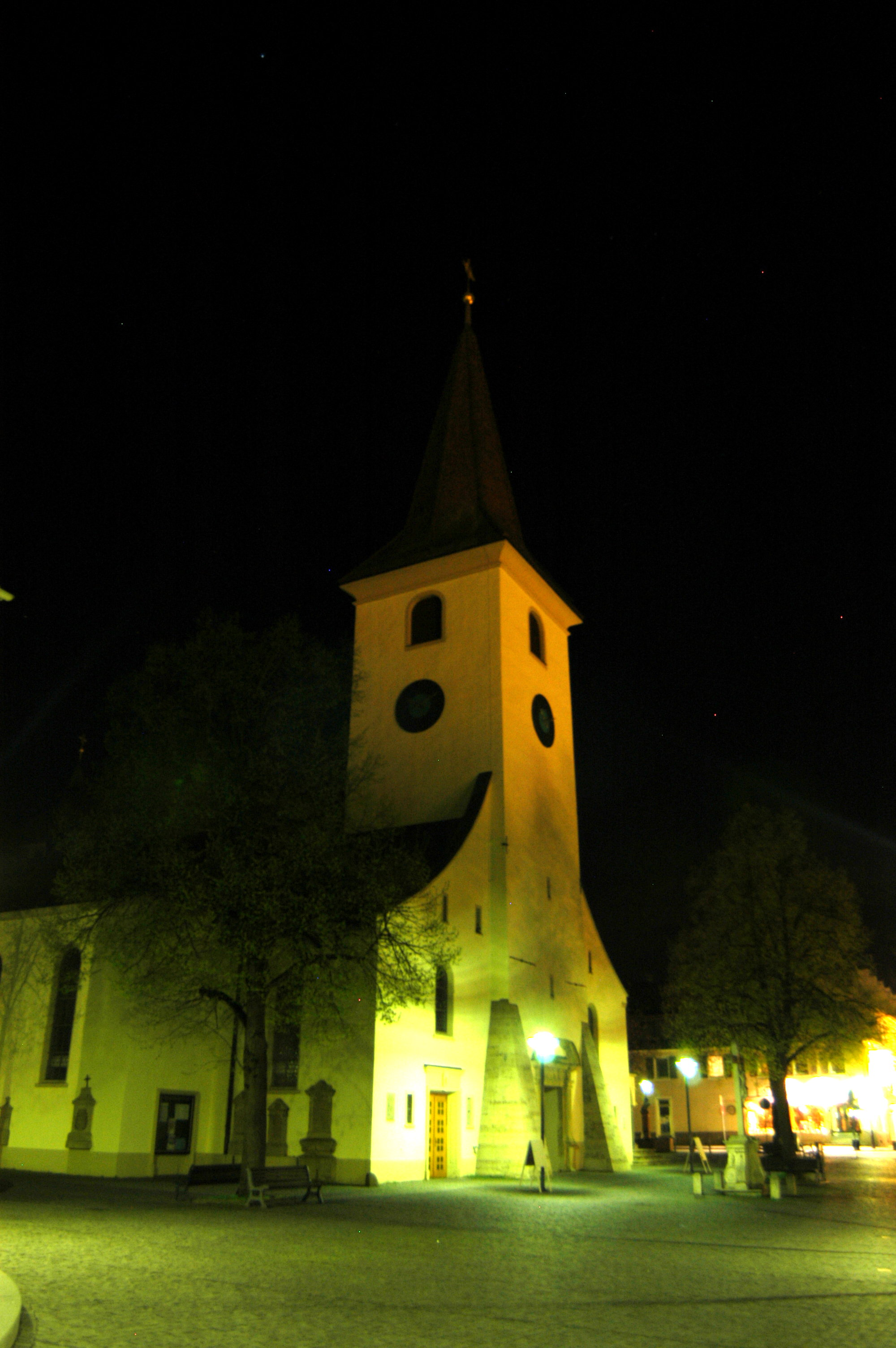
Sankt Albans

Neumagen River

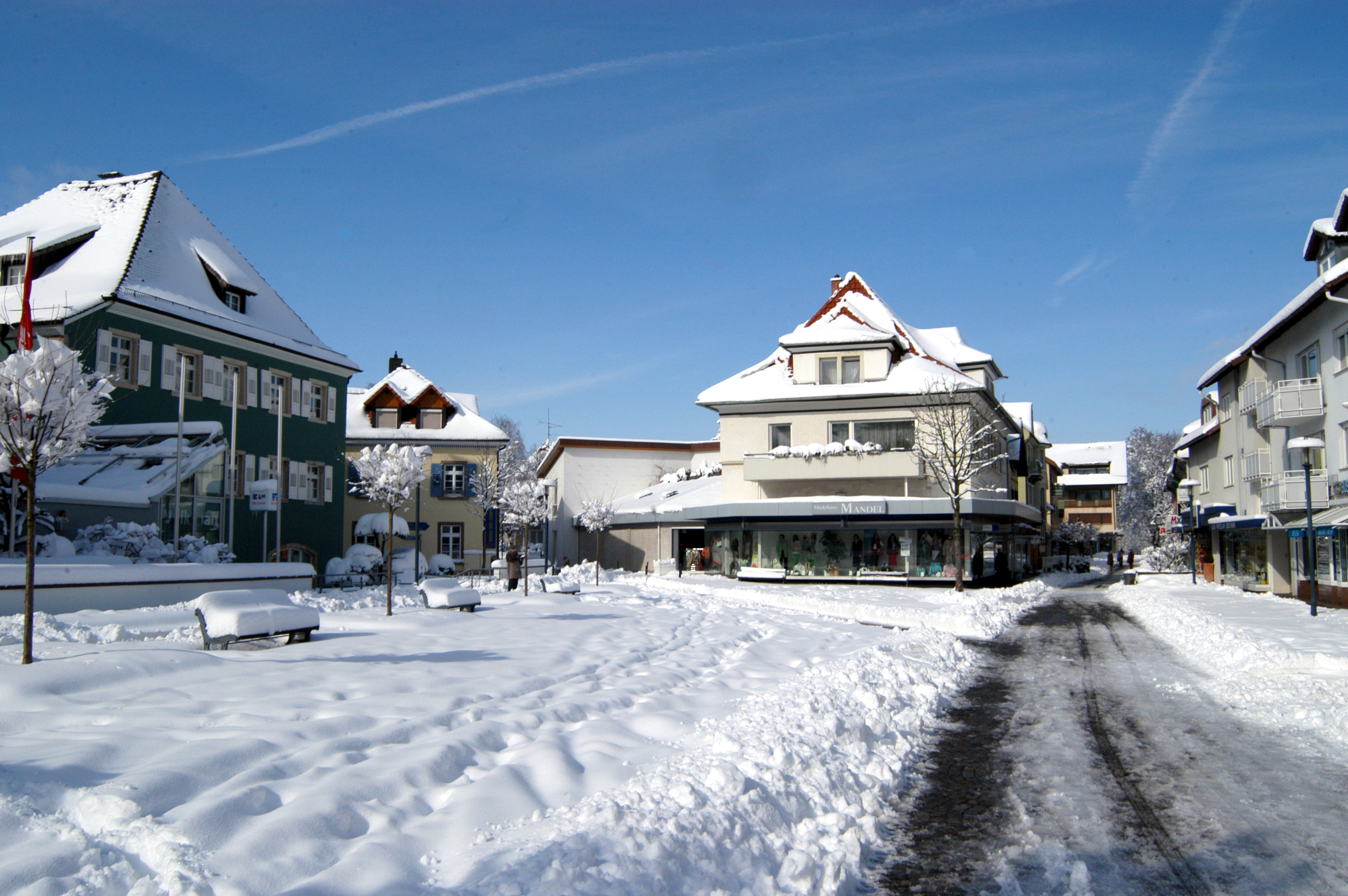
Lammplatz Snow

Kurpark Pheasants

=== Linked to Bad Krozingen ===
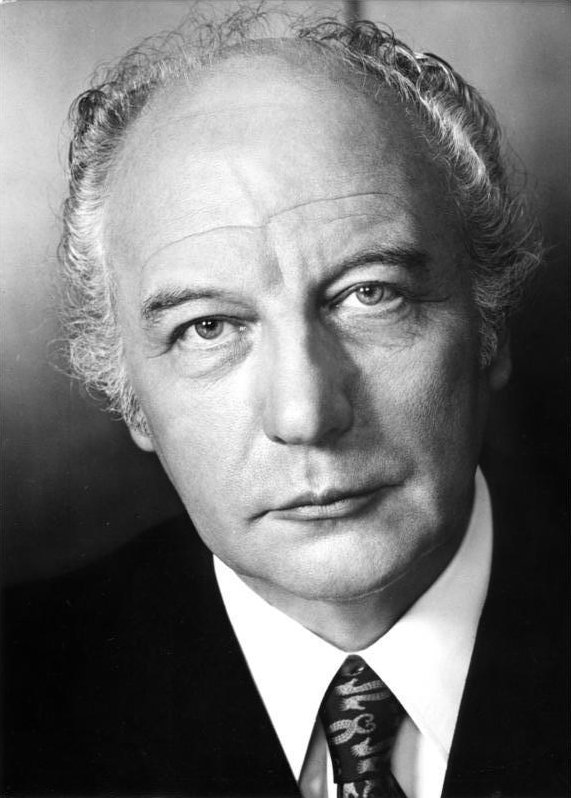
Walter Scheel 1974

- Marquard Herrgott (1694–1762), dean, Benedictine monk, priest, diplomat, historian and librarian
- Fritz Raschig (1863–1928), chemist and politician, allowed to drill in Krozingen for oil; however, a carbon dioxide source was discovered, which was the basis for the cure
- Zenta Mauriņa (1897–1978), writer; lived from 1966 in Bad Krozingen
- Carl Ueter (1900–1985), composer; died in Bad Krozingen
- Walter Scheel (1919–2016), politician (FDP), German President (Bundespräsident) 1974–1979, lived in Bad Krozingen since late 2008
- Oliver Baumann (born 1990), soccer goalie, learned to play football in the youth of FC Bad Krozingen
