= Munster (disambiguation) =

Munster is the southernmost province of Ireland, comprising the counties of Clare, Cork, Kerry, Limerick, Tipperary and Waterford.

Munster may also refer to:

== Places ==
=== Australia ===
- Munster, Western Australia, a suburb of Perth

=== Canada ===
- Munster, Ontario, a neighbourhood in Ottawa

=== France ===
- Munster, Haut-Rhin, a town of Alsace and a commune in the Haut-Rhin department
- Munster, Moselle, a village of Lorraine and a commune in the Moselle department

=== Germany ===
- Münster, an independent city in North Rhine-Westphalia
- Munster, Lower Saxony, a town, site of military installations
  - Munster Training Area (Truppenübungsplatz Munster)

=== Ireland ===
- Munster (European Parliament constituency)

=== South Africa ===
- Munster, KwaZulu-Natal, a town on the south coast of KwaZulu-Natal, South Africa

=== United Kingdom ===
- Munster (ward), an electoral ward in London

=== United States ===
- Munster, Indiana
- Munster Township, Pennsylvania, a locality in Cambria County

== People with the surname ==
- Cameron Munster (born 1994), Australian rugby league player
- Grégoire Munster (born 1998), Luxembourgish rally driver
- Jan van Munster (born 1939), Dutch artist
- Tess Munster (born 1985), American plus-sized model

== Other uses ==
- The Munsters, a U.S. television series
- Munster cheese, a French cheese
- Munster GAA, one of the four provincial councils of the Gaelic Athletic Association
- Munster Rugby, one of four provincial branches of the Irish Rugby Football Union and the professional rugby team operated by this body
- HMS Munster, a Royal Navy destroyer
- MV Munster, several ships
- Earl of Munster, a British peerage

== See also ==
- Münster (disambiguation)
