= Hausen an der Möhlin =

- Ortsteil of Bad Krozingen
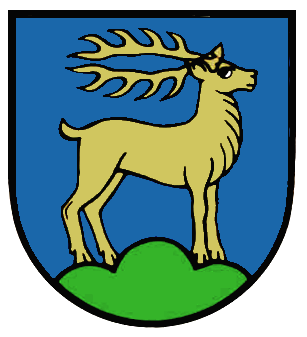
- Coat of arms
- Interactive map of Hausen an der Möhlin
- Location within Germany Location within Baden-Württemberg
- Coordinates: 47°57′26″N 7°40′4″E
- Country: Germany
- State: Baden-Württemberg
- Admin. region: Freiburg
- District: Breisgau-Hochschwarzwald
- Town: Bad Krozingen

Government
  - Mayor: Petra Elbers (CDU)

Area
  - Total: 4.43 km^{2} (1.71 sq mi)
- Elevation: 203 m (666 ft)

Population (2020)
  - Total: 1,672
  - Density: 377/km^{2} (978/sq mi)
- Time zone: UTC+01:00 (CET)
  - Summer (DST): UTC+02:00 (CEST)
- Postal codes: 79189
- Dialling codes: 07633
- Vehicle registration: FR

Hausen an der Möhlin is a village in the district of Breisgau-Hochschwarzwald in Baden-Württemberg. Since September 1973, it is an Ortsteil of Bad Krozingen.

== Gallery ==
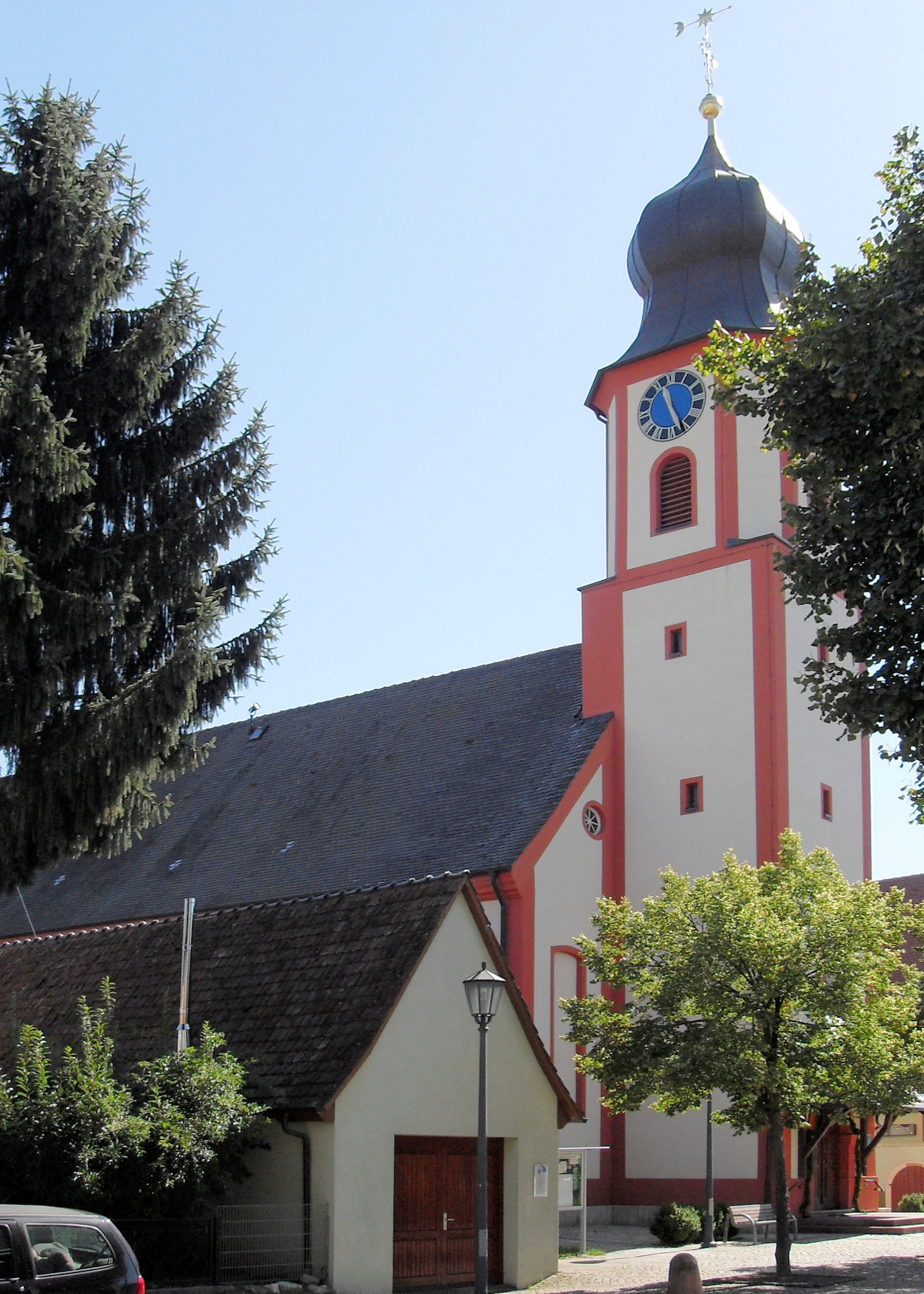
Church St. Johannes

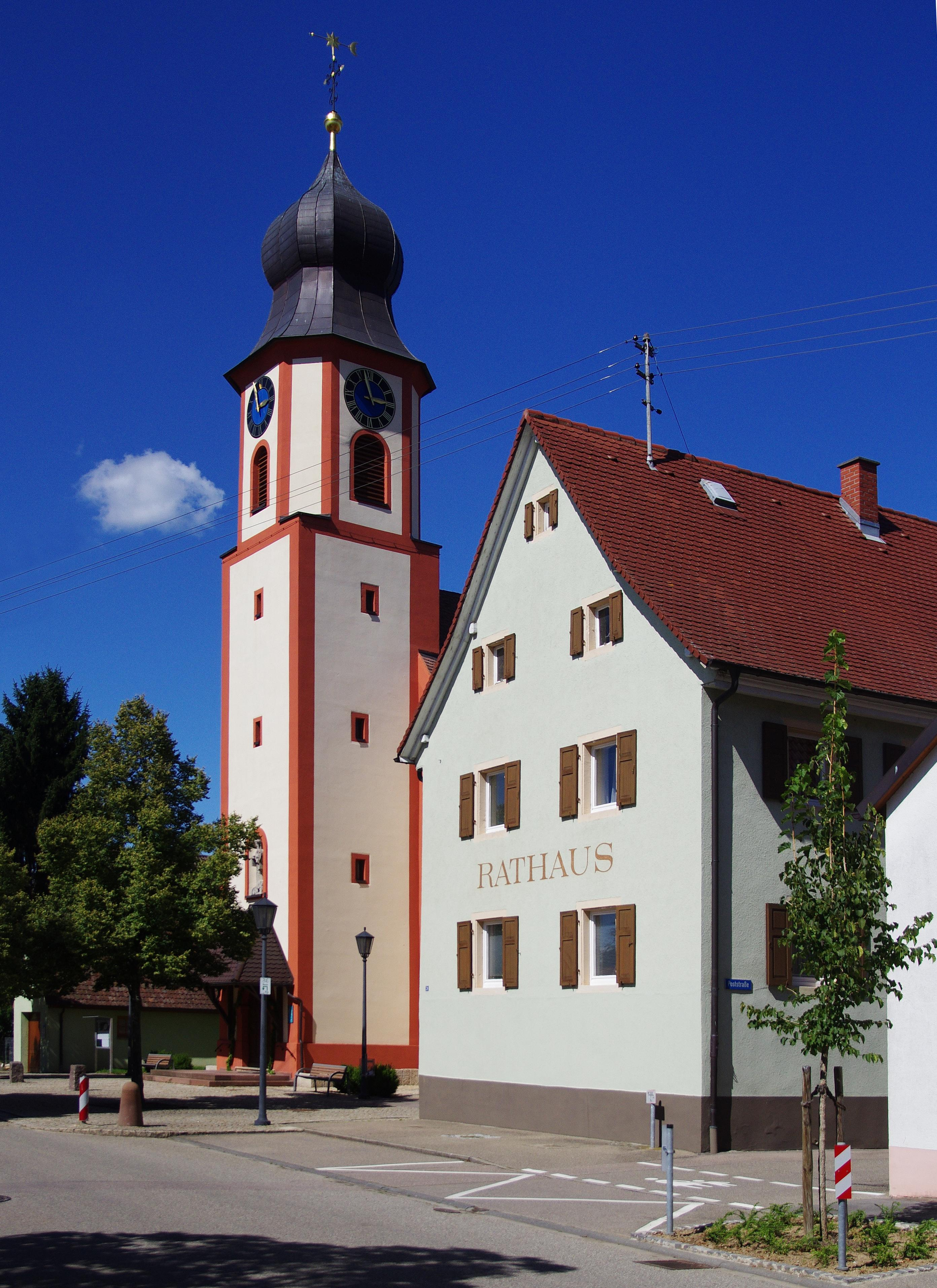
Town Hall and Church St. Johannes

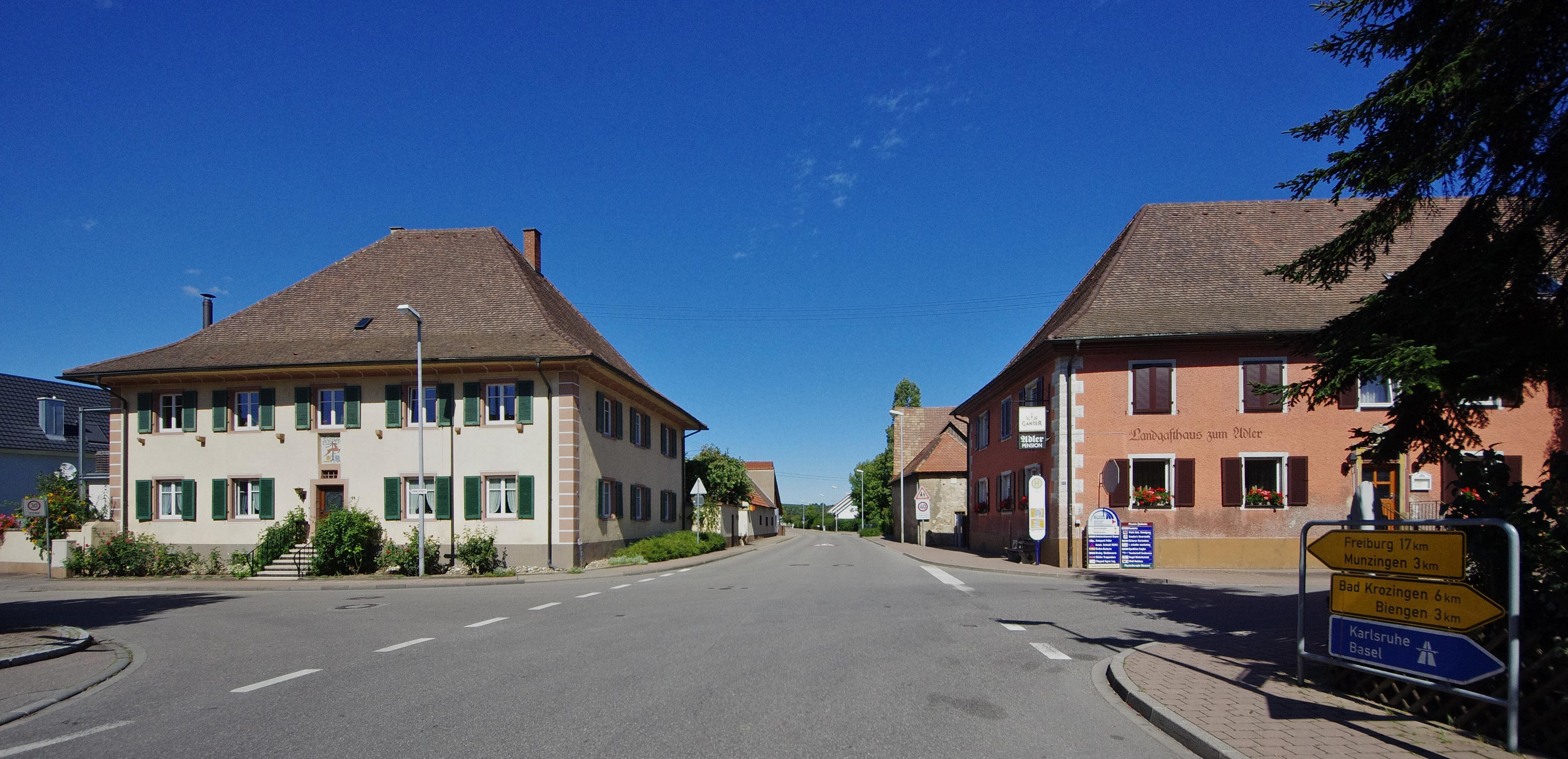
Hausen
