= Marquard Herrgott =

German Benedictine historian and diplomat

Marquard Herrgott (9 October 1694 – 9 October 1762) was a German Benedictine historian and diplomat.

Hergott was born at Freiburg in the Breisgau. After studying humanities at Freiburg and Strasburg, he became tutor in a private family at the latter place and accompanied his two pupils to Paris, where he remained two years. Upon his return to Germany he entered the Benedictine Abbey of St. Blasien in the Black Forest, made his vows on 17 November 1715, and was sent to Rome to study theology. After being ordained priest on 17 Dec., 1718, he returned to St. Blasien.

In 1721 he went to the Abbey of St. Gall to study Semitic languages, but was soon recalled in order to accompany his abbot to Vienna, where he devoted himself for a few months to the study of history. Shortly after, he was sent to the Abbey of Saint-Germain-des-Prés to continue his historical studies under the direction of the learned Maurist Benedictines.

The first fruit of these studies was a valuable work on old monastic customs, Vetus disciplina monastica (Paris, 1726). Shortly after the publication of this work, Herrgott returned to St. Blasien, gathered material for a history of the Diocese of Constance and wrote a history of St. Blasien, which is preserved in manuscript at St. Paul's Abbey in Carinthia.

In 1728 he was sent to the imperial Court of Vienna as diplomatic representative of the Estates of Breisgau, which then belonged to Austria, and filled this position very creditably over twenty years. While at Vienna he made a thorough study of the history of the imperial house of Habsburg and, after eight years of research, published the first three volumes of his valuable work on the Austrian Imperial family Genealogia diplomatica Augusta Gentis Habsburgicæ (Vienna, 1737). The continuation of this work he published under the title Monumenta Augustæ Domus Austriacæ, vol. I (Vienna, 1750), vol. II (Freiburg, 1753), vol. III (Freiburg, 1760), second edition (St. Blasien, 1773).

As reward for his labours he had been appointed imperial councillor and historiographer in 1737. In 1749 he gave offence to the imperial Court by defending the rights of the Church and the privileges of the Estates, and, in consequence, was forced to resign his office. His abbot appointed him provost of Krozingen and governor of Staufen and Kirchhofen, which were dependencies of the Abbey of St. Blasien.

He died at Krozingen near Freiburg.
