= MV Munster =

MV Munster is the name of the following ships named for the Irish province Munster:

- MV Munster (1937)
- MV Munster (1947)
- MV Munster (1968)

== See also ==
- Munster (disambiguation)
