= Trudpert =

7th century missionary

Saint Trudpert
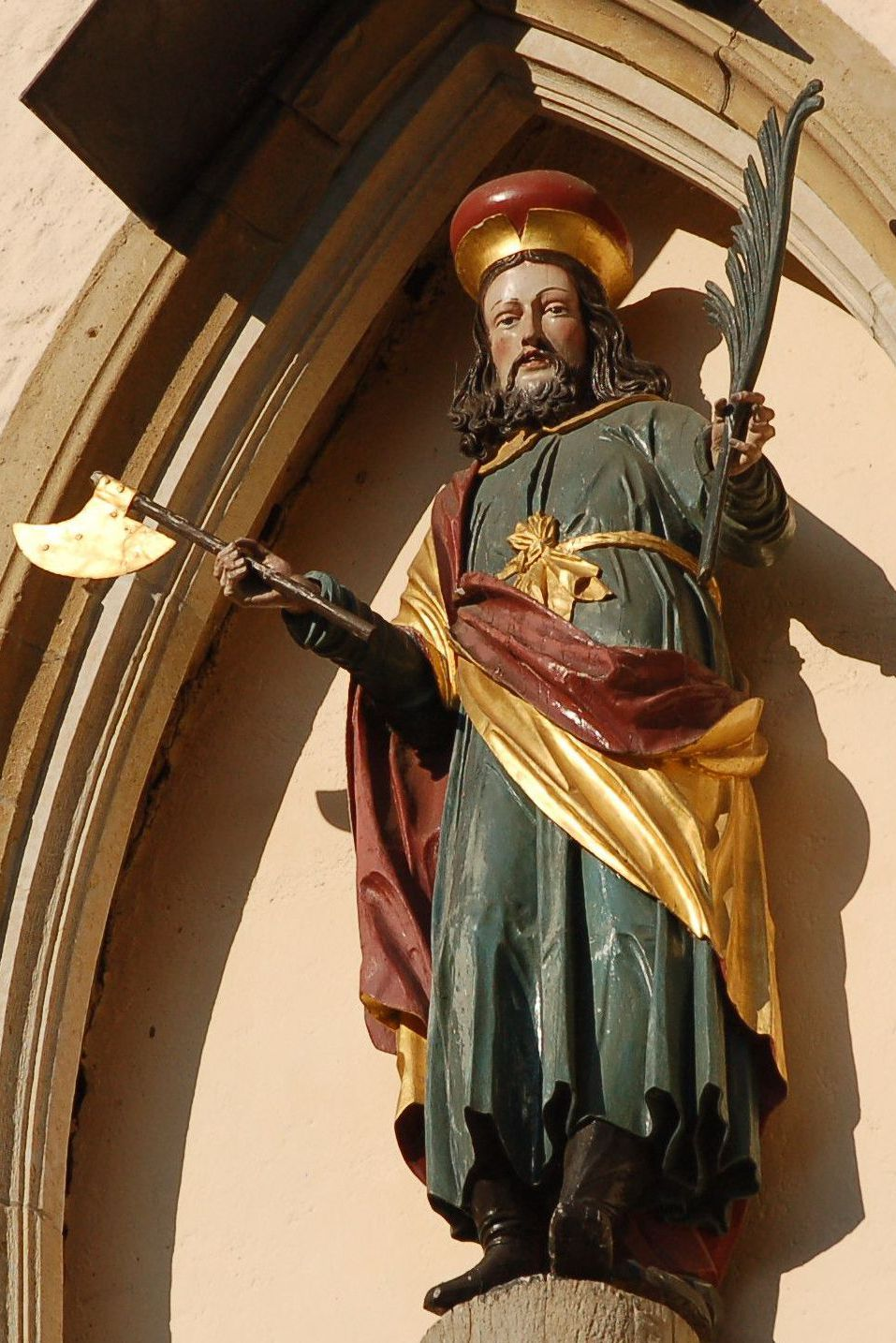
- Statue of Trudpert, Abbey of Münstertal

The Martyr of the Black Forest
- Born: Ireland or Germany
- Died: 607 or 644 AD
- Venerated in: Roman Catholic Church; Eastern Orthodox Church
- Feast: April 26
- Attributes: axe, palm of martyrdom

Saint Trudpert (d. c. 607 or 644) was a missionary in Germany in the seventh century. He is generally called a Celtic monk from Ireland, but some consider him to be German.

Having procured the approval of the pope for his mission, Trudpert traveled along the Rhine until he came to Breisgau, where he established a hermitage near Münstertal. The local lord gave him the land, where Trudpert cleared the trees and built a cell. The noble also loaned him some serfs to assist with his labors; according to tradition, Trudpert was murdered by two of them. He was buried in his oratory, which became a site of pilgrimage.

== Life ==
According to legend, he went first to Rome in order to receive from the pope authority for his mission. Returning from Italy he traveled along the Rhine to the country of the Alamanni in the Breisgau. A person of rank named Otbert gave him land for his mission about 25 km (16 mi) south of Freiburg in Baden, today a part of the village Münstertal, Black Forest.

Trudpert cleared off the trees and built a cell and a little oratory which later Bishop Martinus of Constance dedicated to Saints Peter and Paul. Here, Trudpert led an ascetic and laborious life.

According to a tradition that is now discounted, he was murdered while he slept under a pine by one of the serfs whom Otbert had given him in revenge for severe tasks imposed. Otbert gave Trudpert an honourable burial. The Benedictine Abbey of St. Trudpert [de] was built in the next century on the spot where Trudpert was buried. The story of his life is full of legendary details that no correct judgment can be formed of Trudpert's era, the kind of work he did, or of its success. The period when he lived in the Breisgau was formerly given as 640-643, whereas other scholars give 607 as the year of his death. The day of his death is 26 April.

== Veneration ==
In 815, his bones were translated and the first biography of him was written; this biography was revised in the tenth and thirteenth centuries. His reliquary arrived to the abbey church of St. Trudpert and parts are held in the Ettenheim monastery.

== See also ==
- St. Trudpert's Abbey
- Sisters of St. Joseph of St. Trudpert
