= Tunsel =

- Ortsteil of Bad Krozingen
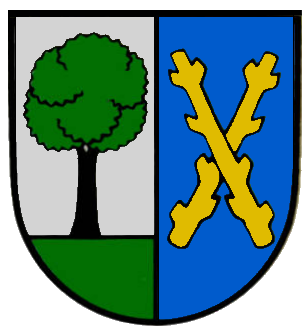
- Coat of arms
- Interactive map of Tunsel
- Location within Germany Location within Baden-Württemberg
- Coordinates: 47°54′12″N 7°40′11″E
- Country: Germany
- State: Baden-Württemberg
- Admin. region: Freiburg
- District: Breisgau-Hochschwarzwald
- Town: Bad Krozingen

Government
  - Mayor: Peter Ritzel (CDU)

Area
  - Total: 9.21 km^{2} (3.56 sq mi)
- Elevation: 223 m (732 ft)

Population (2020)
  - Total: 2,153
  - Density: 234/km^{2} (605/sq mi)
- Time zone: UTC+01:00 (CET)
  - Summer (DST): UTC+02:00 (CEST)
- Postal codes: 79189
- Dialling codes: 07633
- Vehicle registration: FR

Tunsel is a village in the district of Breisgau-Hochschwarzwald in Baden-Württemberg. Since January 1974, it is an Ortsteil of Bad Krozingen.

== Gallery ==
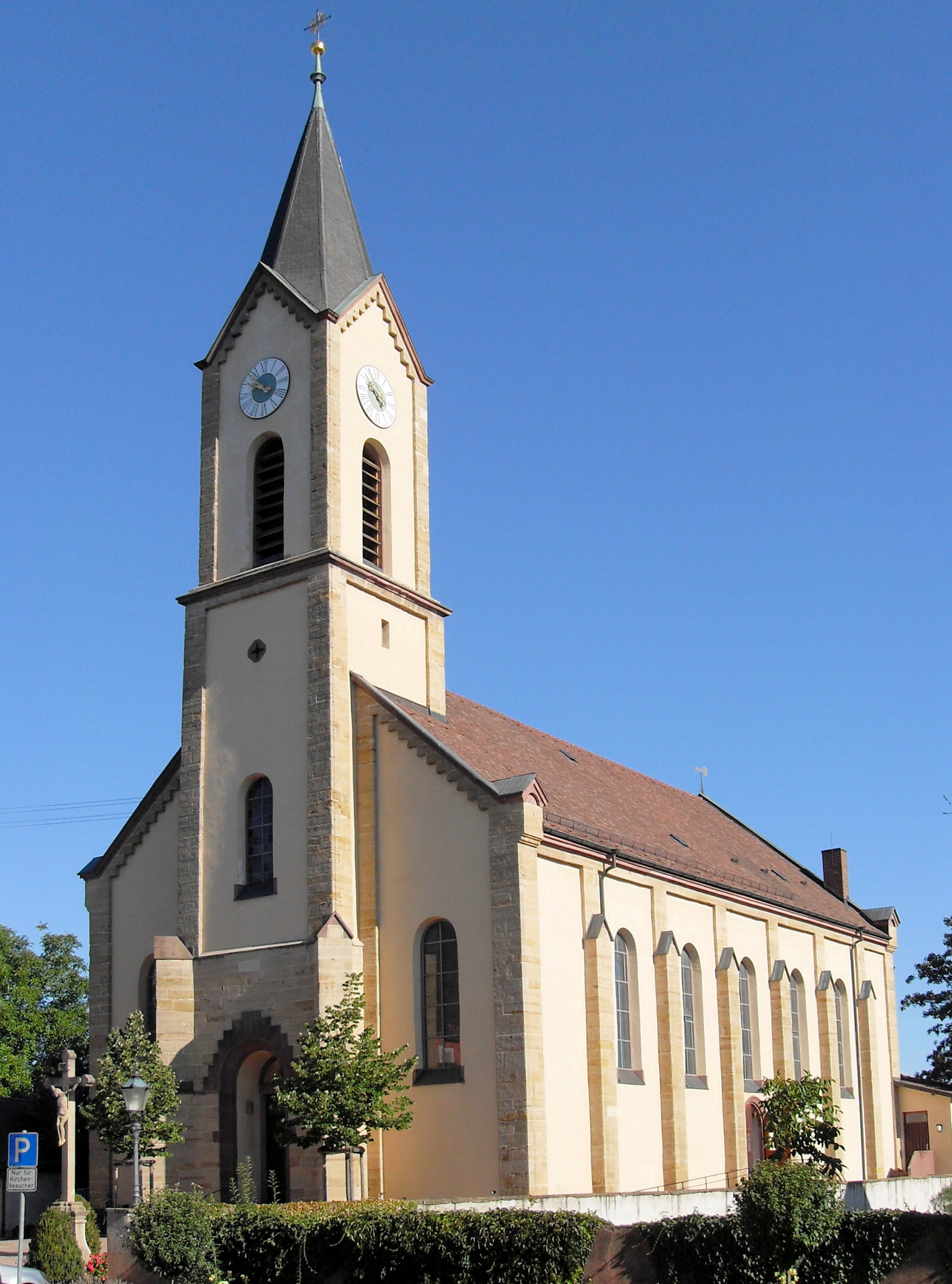
St. Michael Church

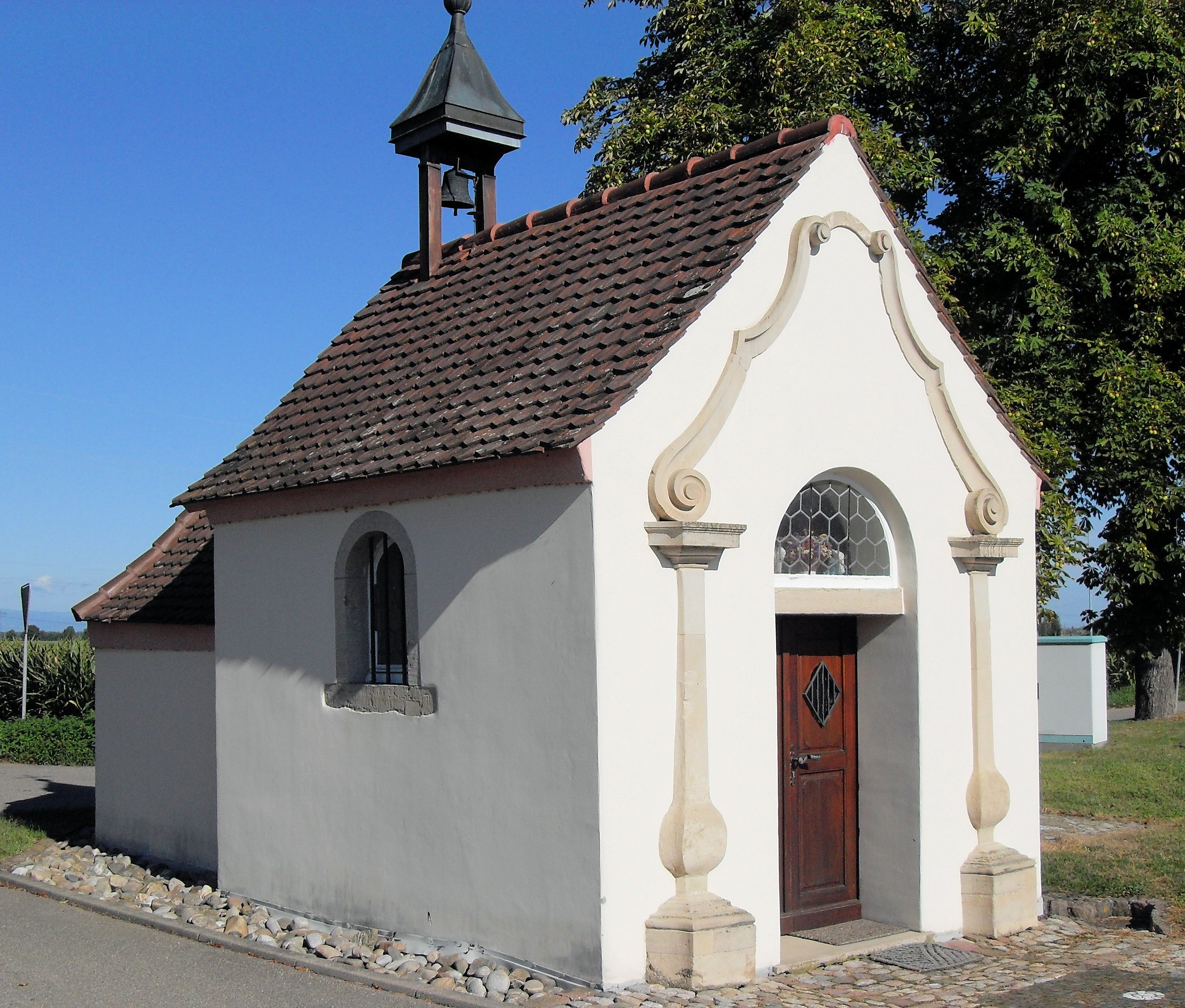
Maria-Hilf Kapelle (Our Lady Help of Christians Chapel)

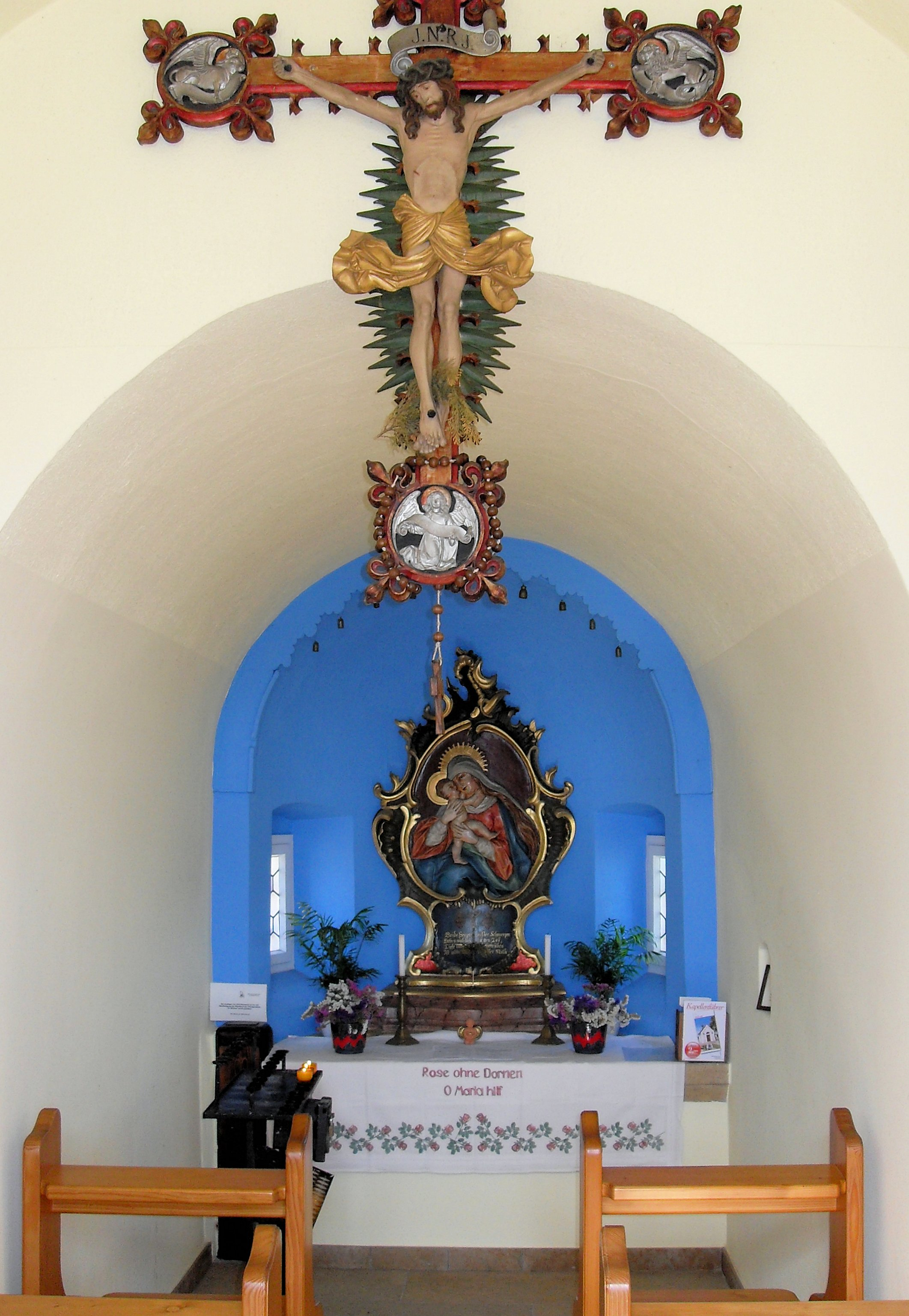
Inside Maria-Hilf Kapelle
