= Schlatt (Bad Krozingen) =

- Ortsteil of Bad Krozingen
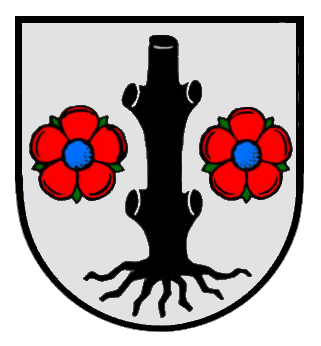
- Coat of arms
- Interactive map of Schlatt
- Location within Germany Location within Baden-Württemberg
- Coordinates: 47°55′33″N 7°40′25″E
- Country: Germany
- State: Baden-Württemberg
- Admin. region: Freiburg
- District: Breisgau-Hochschwarzwald
- Town: Bad Krozingen

Government
  - Mayor: Ottmar Seywald (CDU)

Area
  - Total: 5.74 km^{2} (2.22 sq mi)

Population (2020)
  - Total: 1,472
  - Density: 256/km^{2} (664/sq mi)
- Time zone: UTC+01:00 (CET)
  - Summer (DST): UTC+02:00 (CEST)
- Postal codes: 79189
- Dialling codes: 07633
- Vehicle registration: FR

Schlatt is a village in the district of Breisgau-Hochschwarzwald in Baden-Württemberg. Since January 1973, it is an Ortsteil of Bad Krozingen.

== Gallery ==
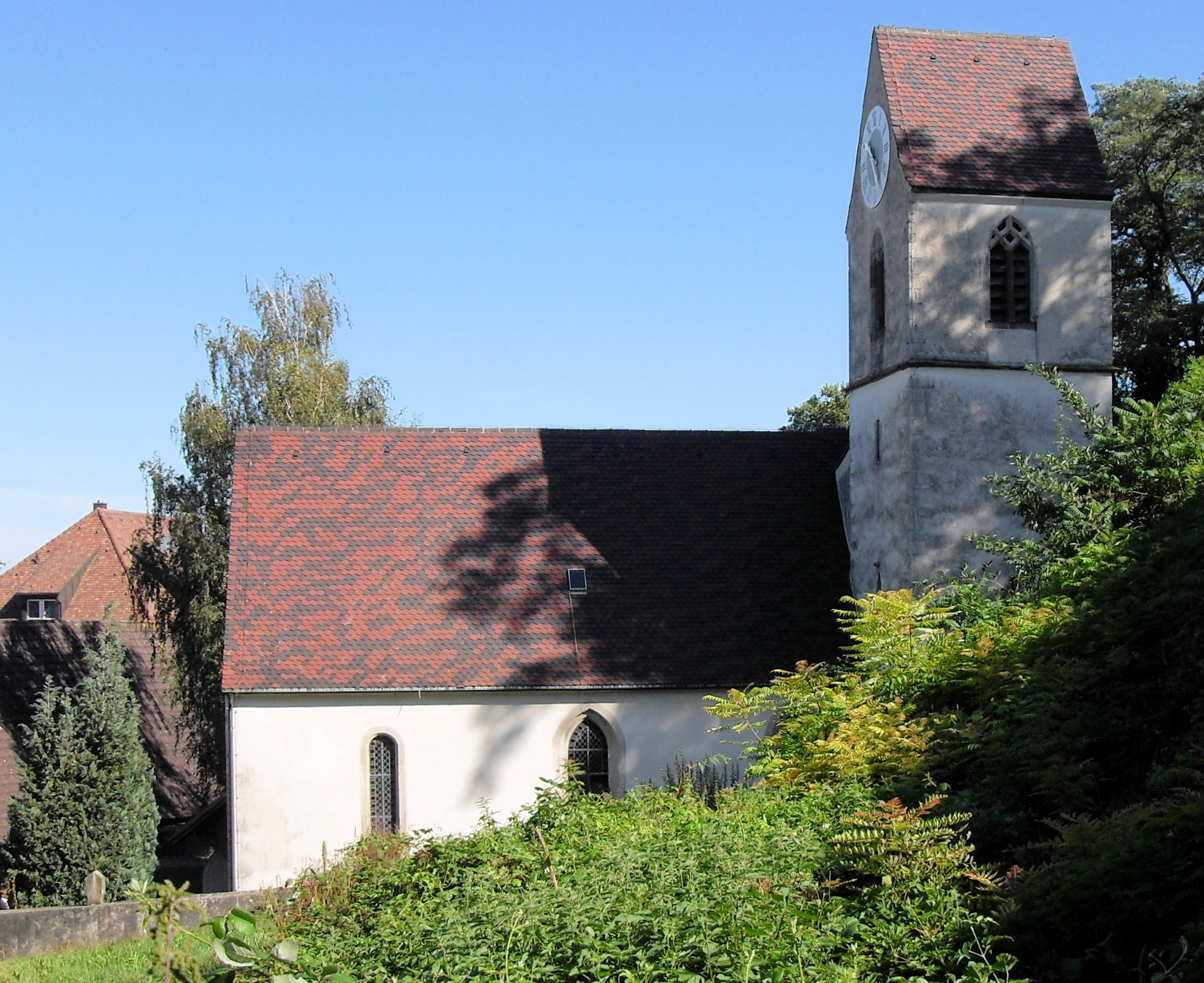
St. Sebastian Church

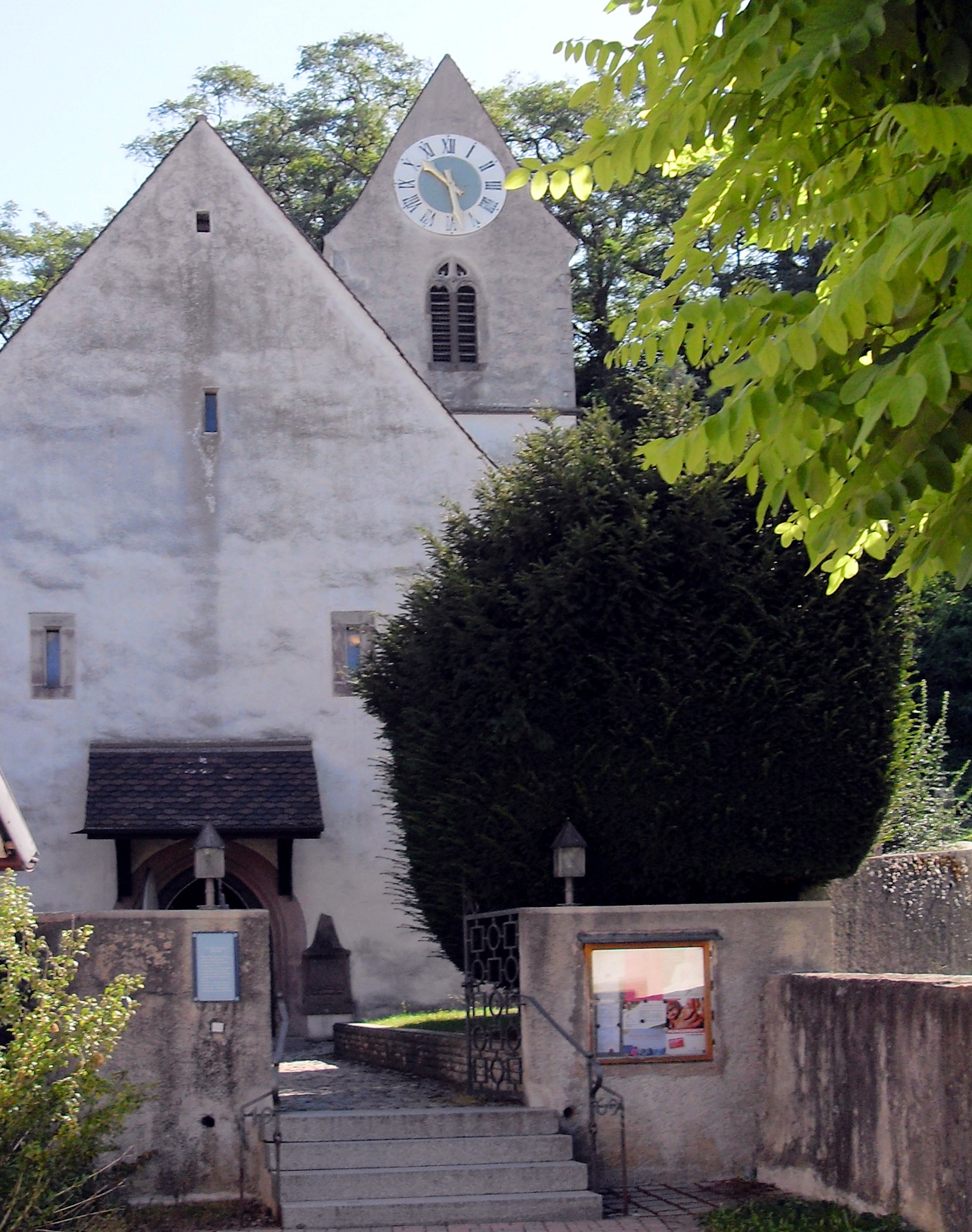
St. Sebastian, church entrance

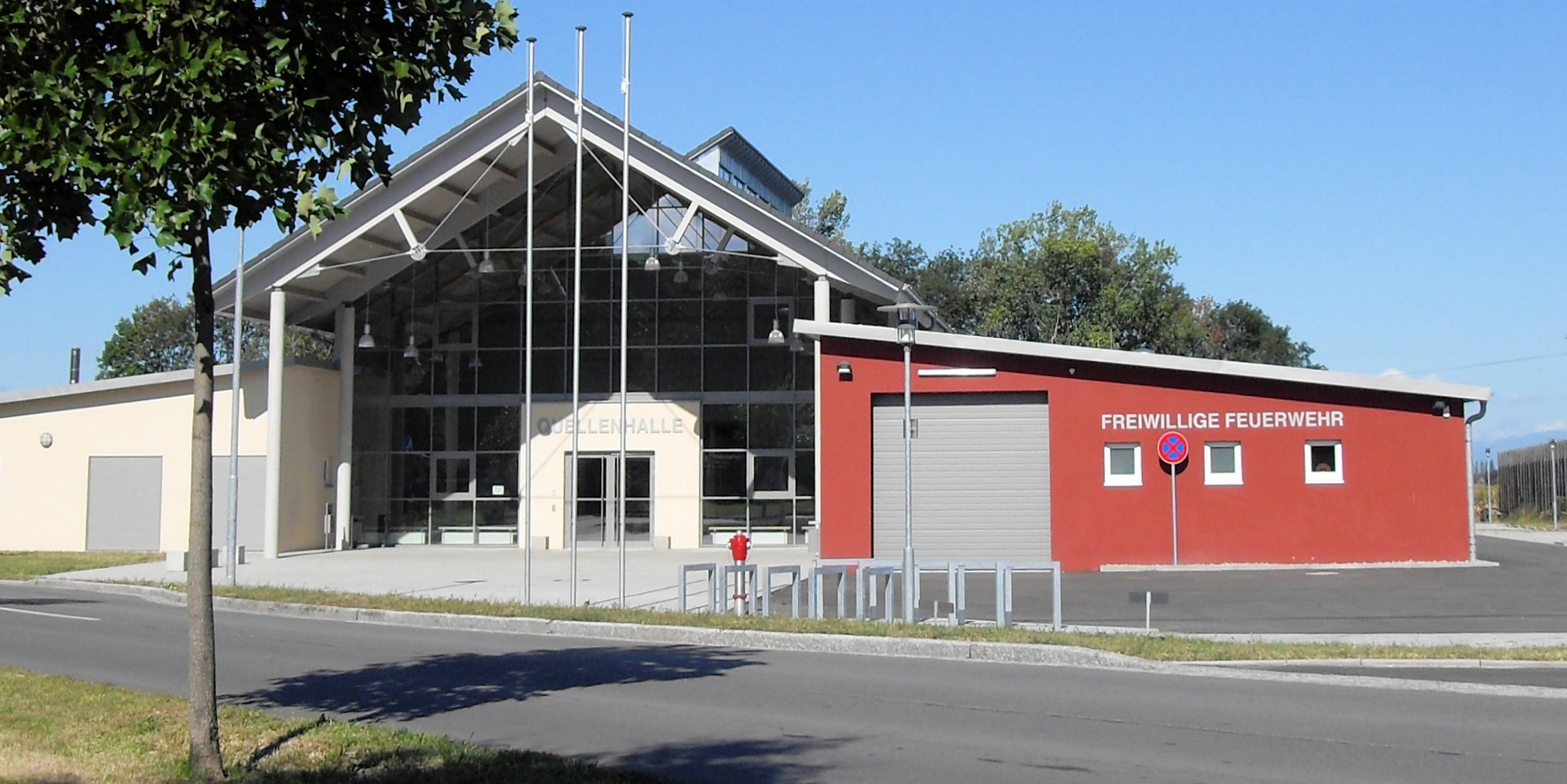
"Quellenhalle" (community centre) and fire station, opened in 2011
