= Biengen =

- Ortsteil of Bad Krozingen
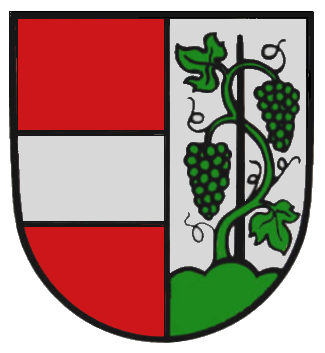
- Coat of arms
- Interactive map of Biengen
- Location within Germany Location within Baden-Württemberg
- Coordinates: 47°56′19″N 7°41′24″E
- Country: Germany
- State: Baden-Württemberg
- Admin. region: Freiburg
- District: Breisgau-Hochschwarzwald
- Town: Bad Krozingen

Government
  - Mayor: Benjamin Borgas

Area
  - Total: 6.09 km^{2} (2.35 sq mi)
- Elevation: 213 m (699 ft)

Population (2020)
  - Total: 1,848
  - Density: 303/km^{2} (786/sq mi)
- Time zone: UTC+01:00 (CET)
  - Summer (DST): UTC+02:00 (CEST)
- Postal codes: 79189
- Dialling codes: 07633
- Vehicle registration: FR

Biengen is a village in the district of Breisgau-Hochschwarzwald in Baden-Württemberg. Since December 1971, it is an Ortsteil of Bad Krozingen.

== Gallery ==
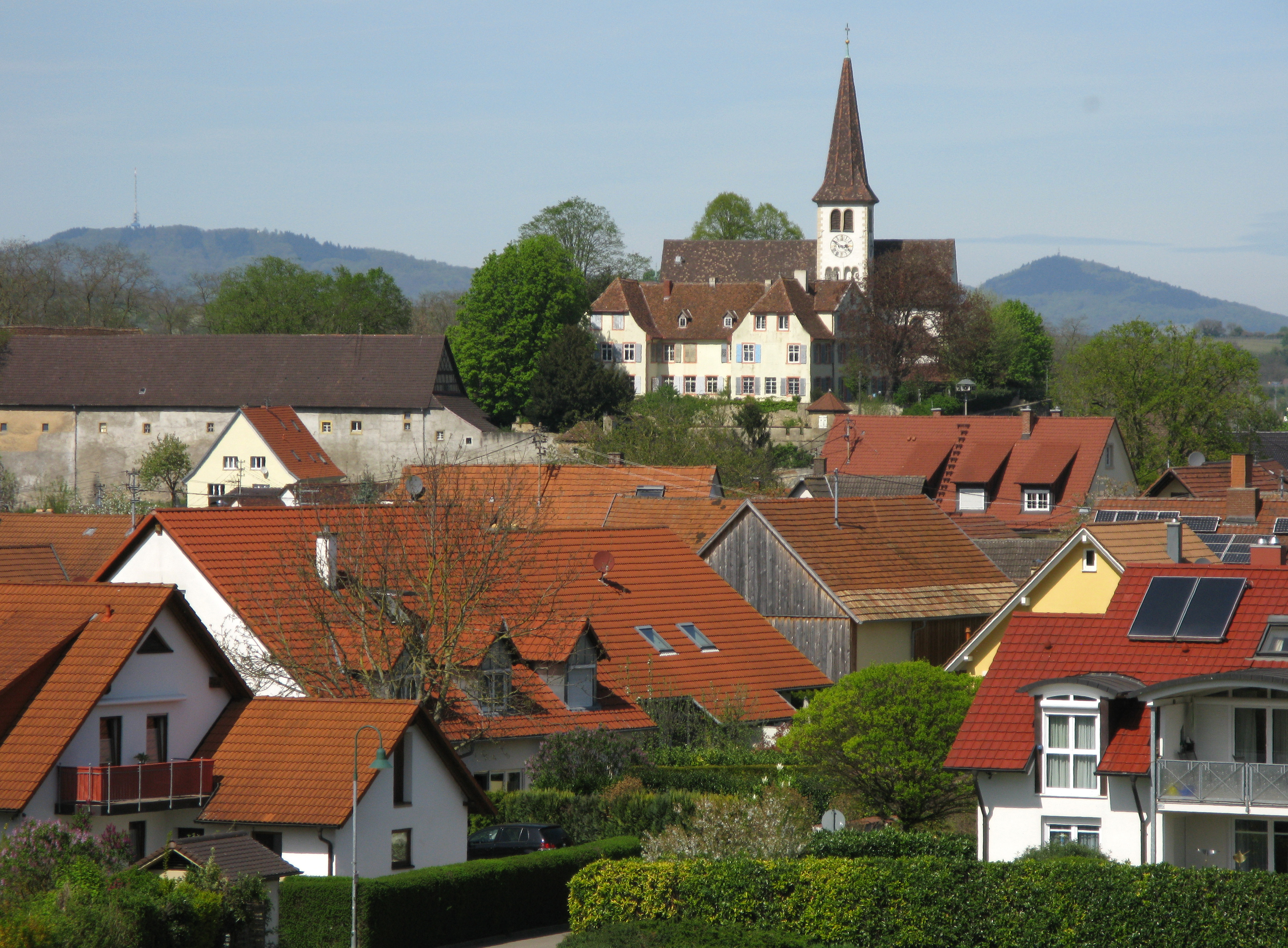
Biengen with palace and Church St. Leodegar

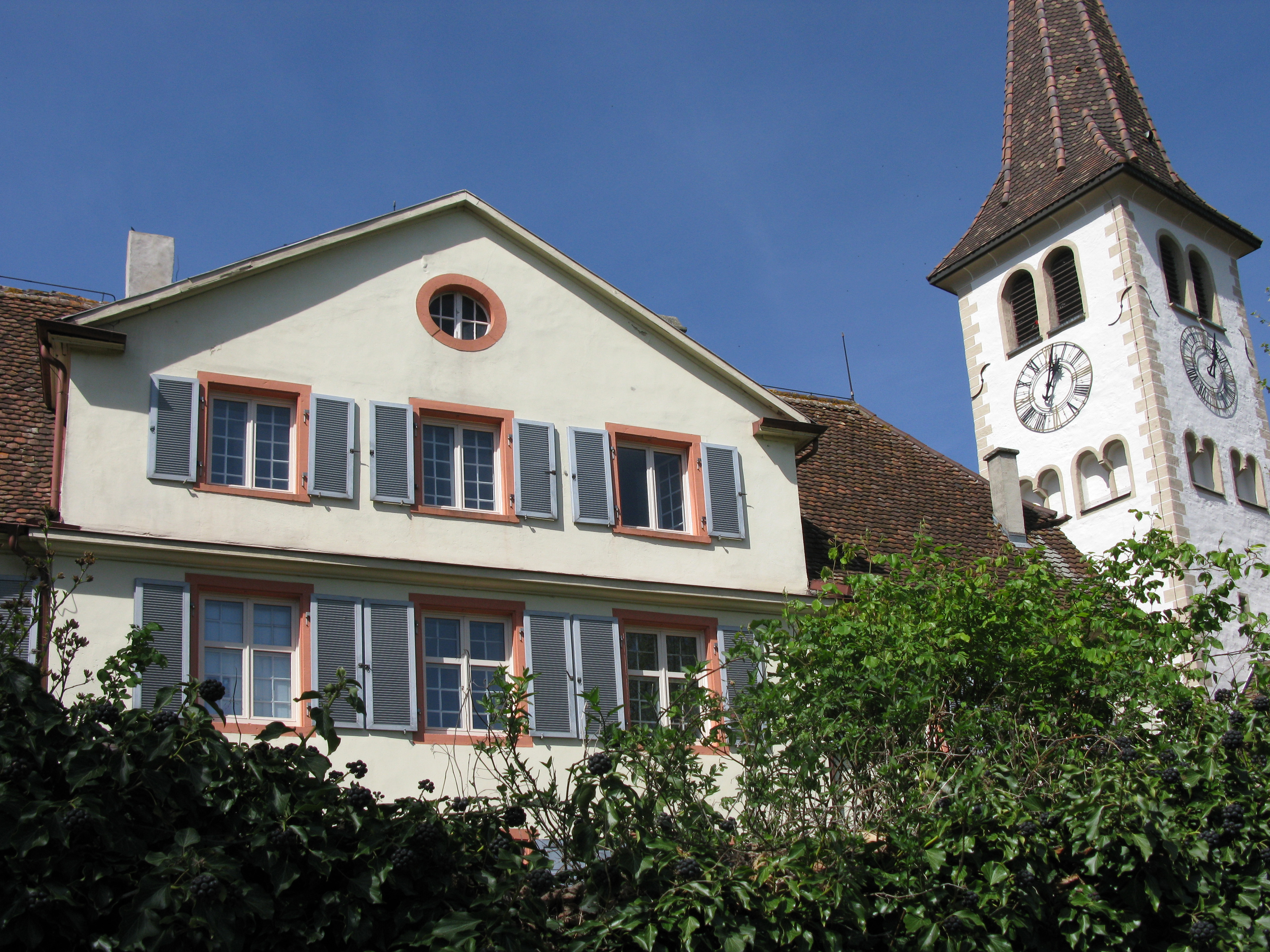
Palace and Church St. Leodegar

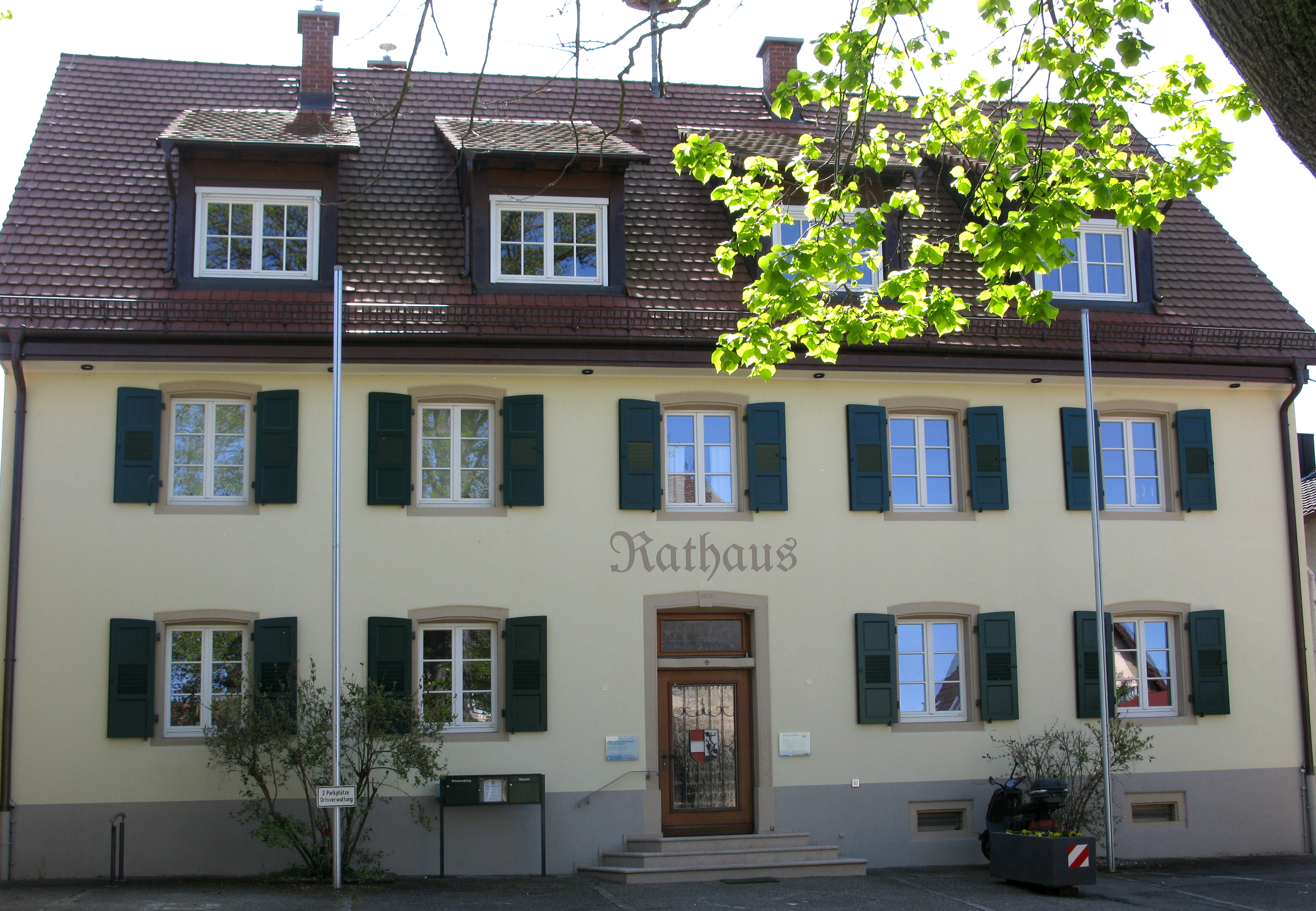
Town Hall of Biengen
