= Treaty of Münster =

Treaty of Münster refers to two treaties signed in 1648, and forming part of the Peace of Westphalia ending the Thirty Years' War:

- Peace of Münster of January 1648 (ratified in May 1648) ending the Eighty Years' War between the Dutch Republic and Spain
- Treaty of Münster (October 1648), which ended the Thirty Years' War between France and the Holy Roman Empire
