= Münster (surname) =

Münster, or Muenster, is a German surname. Notable people with the name include:

- Alexander Münster (1858–1922), German aristocrat
- Amalie Münster (1767–1814), Danish courtier, translator and poet
- Eleonore von Münster (1734–1794), German noblewoman, writer, and lay musician
- Ernst zu Münster (1766–1839), German statesman in the service of the House of Hanover
- Count Georg zu Münster (1776–1844), German paleontologist
- Georg Herbert Münster (1820–1902), German statesman
- Hermann von Münster (c. 1330–1392), German master glassmaker
- Jens Münster (born 1990), German politician
- Johannes Münster (died 1544), Auxiliary Bishop of Mainz
- Karen Muenster (1942–2026), American politician
- Leopold Münster (1920–1944), Luftwaffe ace and recipient of the Knight's Cross of the Iron Cross with Oak Leaves
- Mary Kathryn Muenster (born 1967), American philanthropist and civic leader
- Mia Münster (1894–1970), German artist
- Reinhard Münster (director) (born 1955), German film director
- Sebastian Münster (1488–1552), German cartographer, cosmographer, Hebraist and lexicographer
- Ted Muenster, American businessman
