= Münsterländer =

Münsterländer may refer to:

- A person from the German region of Münster
- One of two breeds of dogs of the gun dog type originating in the Münster region of Germany:
  - Large Münsterländer, a breed of dog weighing approximately 30 kg (66 lbs)
  - Small Münsterländer, a breed of dog weighing approximately 16 kg (35 lbs)
