= Münstertal, Black Forest =

Münstertal
- Municipality
- Saint Trudpert Monastery

- Coat of arms

- Location of Münstertal within Breisgau-Hochschwarzwald district
- Interactive map of Münstertal
- Location within Germany Location within Baden-Württemberg
- Coordinates: 47°51′17″N 7°47′3″E
- Country: Germany
- State: Baden-Württemberg
- Admin. region: Freiburg
- District: Breisgau-Hochschwarzwald

Government
  - Mayor (2023–31): Patrick Weichert

Area
  - Total: 67.74 km^{2} (26.15 sq mi)
- Elevation: 592 m (1,942 ft)

Population (2025-12-31)
  - Total: 5,022
  - Density: 74.14/km^{2} (192.0/sq mi)
- Time zone: UTC+01:00 (CET)
  - Summer (DST): UTC+02:00 (CEST)
- Postal codes: 79242–79244
- Dialling codes: 07636
- Vehicle registration: FR
- Website: www.muenstertal.de

Münstertal (German pronunciation: [ˈmʏnstɐˌtaːl], lit. 'Münster Valley'; officially Münstertal/Schwarzwald) is a municipality in the southern Black Forest, which belongs to the district of Breisgau-Hochschwarzwald in Baden-Württemberg in southern Germany. It is 3 miles east from Staufen.

== Geography ==
Location

The Münstertal stretches from Staufen im Breisgau up into the Black Forest. It divides into several side valleys and extends in the direction of Belchen (Schwarzwald), via the district of Stohren towards the Schauinsland and via the Münsterhalde towards Badenweiler. The altitude of the Münstertal ranges from 380 m above sea level up to 1414 m on the summit of the Belchen, which represents a difference of 1060 meters.

Constituent communities

The Münstertal consists of the formerly independent communities Obermünstertal (Upper Münstertal) and Untermünstertal (Lower Münstertal) with a total of 65 villages, hamlets, farms and houses.

The villages of Breitmatt, Diezelbach, Hasengrund, Laisacker, Landensberg, Langenbach, Lehengasse, Limberg, Rammelsbach, Sägerstrasse (Sägegasse), Sirnitz, Sirnitzgrund, Wildsbach, which were established between 1949 and 1950, are situated in Untermünstertal, and the villages of Fischmatte, Gufenbach, Hinterer Rotenbuck, Hof, Kaltwasser, Mulden, Münster (on the left), Münster (on the right), Neuhäuser (on the left), Neuhäuser (on the right), Prestenberg-Lehn, Süßenbrunn, Vorderer Rotenbuck, Upper Wasen, Lower Wasen and Ziegelplatz were established in 1960.

== History ==
The village of Münster was first mentioned in 1258 and gave the valley its name. In 1346 it was destroyed by the Counts of Freiburg.

On December 1, 1971, the independent communities of Obermünstertal and Untermünstertal merged to become the municipality of Münstertal.

== Demographics ==
Population development:

Year	Inhabitants
1990	5,020
2001	5,170
2011	5,044
2021	5,108

== Economy and Infrastructure ==
Tourism

A tourist board was founded in 1935. There is a campsite in Diezelbach which is open all year round.

Transport

A SWEG Talent 3 arrives at Münstertal station, the terminus of the Bad Krozingen–Münstertal railway.

The Münstertal is connected by the Bad Krozingen–Münstertal railway to the national rail network. The railway is operated by the Südwestdeutschen Verkehrs-AG. The electrification of the line has been completed and the electric train started operating on 21 September 2013.

== Culture and Attractions ==
Museums

- The museum in the Black Forest House 1902 (formerly: der Kaltwasserhof), where the ARD television series under the same name that received the Adolf-Grimme-Preis in 2003 has been produced, reports on everyday life on a mountain farm as well as on the creation of the famous TV production.
- The bee museum is known across the borders of Baden and shows the cohabitation of men and bees from the Stone Age to the present. It is the biggest of its kind in Europe.
- The exhibition mine Teufelsgrund displays the mining tradition of the Black Forest. The silver mining of the Middle Ages brought Münster, how Münstertal was called back then, great wealth. Until 1958 fluorspar and barite was mined here. Today, the mine disposes over an Asthma (asthma) therapie tunnel where respiratory- and skin diseases are being treated.
- The museum for mining, forest- and settlement history gives an insight on the tradition and the history of the Münstertal.

Famous Buildings

The monastery St. Trudpert was founded in the 9th century. For a long time it was the village´s center and the starting point of the christianization of the southern part of the Black Forest. Today, it represents the mother house of the nuns of the holy Josef.

In the district Obermünstertal you can visit the ruin of the castle Scharfenstein.

Deer sculpture

On the main road L L 130 between Rotenbuck and Münsterhalden, unknown persons set up a life-size deer sculpture on a rock during the Nacht (Walburgis night) night of May 1, 2016.

== Personalities ==
- Hans Karl Abel (1876–1951), author, died in Mühlbach
- Willibald Strohmeyer (1877–1945), Catholic priest, was murdered in Münstertal at the end of the Second World War.
- Franz Gutmann (* 1928 in Obermünstertal), sculptor
- Karl-Josef Fuchs (* 1960 in Münstertal), cook
- Karl Pfefferle
- Maren Wiesler (* 1993), ski racer
- Klara Bühl (* 2000), footballer

== Places ==
=== Museums ===
- Schwarzwaldhaus (Black Forest house), where the documentary film Schwarzwaldhaus 1902 was shot, is a museum about filming and the life of mountain farmers.
- Bienenkundemuseum (Museum for the study of bees).
- Teufelsgrund (Devil's Ground) was a silver mine and is today a museum about mining, but there is also an adit used for the treatment of asthma.

=== Buildings ===
- St. Trudpert was a benedictine monastery.
- Scharfenstein (Sharpstone) was a castle whose ruins can be visited in Obermünstertal.

== Literature ==
- André Bechtold: Die Bergstadt Münster und die habsburgische Herrschaftsbildung am Oberrhein im 14. und 15. Jahrhundert. In: Das Markgräflerland, Band 2/2003, Schopfheim 2003, S. 81–91.
- Korinna Thiem: Die Historische Landschaftsanalyse als Methode für die Fließgewässerbewertung am Beispiel des Münstertals im Schwarzwald. (= Culterra; 46). Universität Freiburg, Freiburg im Breisgau 2006 (PDF-Datei; 15,8 MB)
