= Ebringen =

- Municipality
- Coat of arms

- Location of Ebringen within Breisgau-Hochschwarzwald district
- Interactive map of Ebringen
- Location within Germany Location within Baden-Württemberg
- Coordinates: 47°57′N 7°47′E
- Country: Germany
- State: Baden-Württemberg
- Admin. region: Freiburg
- District: Breisgau-Hochschwarzwald
- Subdivisions: 2

Government
  - Mayor (2022–30): Hans-Peter Widmann

Area
  - Total: 8.18 km^{2} (3.16 sq mi)
- Elevation: 245–644 m (804–2,113 ft)

Population (2025-12-31)
  - Total: 2,852
  - Density: 349/km^{2} (903/sq mi)
- Time zone: UTC+01:00 (CET)
  - Summer (DST): UTC+02:00 (CEST)
- Postal codes: 79285
- Dialling codes: 07664
- Vehicle registration: FR
- Website: www.ebringen.de

Ebringen (Breisgau) is a municipality in the district of Breisgau-Hochschwarzwald in Baden-Württemberg in southern Germany.

== Geography ==
Ebringen is located about 5 km (3 mi) south of Freiburg at the Schoenberg and belongs to the Freiburg metropolitan area. There is also a village named Ebringen near Lake Constance, part of the municipality Gottmadingen and a village Ebring (German: Ebringen), part of the municipality Tenteling in Lorraine, France, which are sometimes confused especially by genealogists.

The entire area of Ebringen near Freiburg is located in the Schoenberg range, foothills of the Black Forest, which is geologically a part of the Rhine Rift Valley. The Schoenberg is characterized by a very diverse surface geology from the Triassic and Jurassic periods of the Mesozoic, Paleogene conglomerates and volcanism and glacial loess deposits.

The residential area is divided by a bypass road into the village Ebringen north of the road and the hamlet Talhausen south of the road. The hamlet Berghausen on the Schoenberg was abandoned in the 15th century. Today there is only a chapel at this place.

Ebringen extends from west to east with the neighbourhoods Herrengaerten (1970), Kaiserstuhl (1960), Gruben (1980), Hinterdorf (old), Unterdorf (old), Wiedenhut (2000), Mitteldorf (old), Siedlung (1937), Oberdorf (old), Dammen (1970), Rebstall (2000), Birkental (old), Jennetal (1995) and Tirol (old, formerly ''Beim Schlemmer'').

Talhausen extends from north to south with the neighbourhoods Baumgarten (1955/1985), Talhausen (old) and Gaishof (1980).

The figures in parentheses show the approximate year of formation.

Isolated dwellings near the Schoenberg summit are Unterer Schoenberghof and Oberer Schoenberghof.

== Politics ==
Local ordinance is the Gemeindeordnung of Baden-Wuerttemberg, which is based on the South German Council Code (Süddeutsche Ratsverfassung). The mayor is both chairman of the municipal council and head of the local administration. The municipal council currently consists of 13 members entitled to vote - the mayor and 12 councillors. While the mayor is elected for 8 years, the term of office of the municipal council is 5 years. The mayor as well as the local council are directly elected by the voting population. This consists of Ebringen resident EU citizens who are at least 16 years old.

=== Council ===
| List | % 2024 | Seats 2019 | % 2019 | Seats 2019 | % 2014 | Seats 2014 | % 2009 | Seats 2009 | % 2004 | Seats 2004 | % 1999 | Seats 1999 | % 1994 | Seats 1994 | Notes |
|---|---|---|---|---|---|---|---|---|---|---|---|---|---|---|---|
| CDU (Christ-Democratic Union of Germany) | 22.9 | 3 | 18.2 | 2 | 21.3 | 3 | 27.1 | 3 | 27.5 | 3 | 30.2 | 4 | 33.2 | 4 | |
| Bürgerliste (Citizens' List) | 30.6 | 3 | 21.7 | 3 | 18.9 | 2 | 23.5 | 3 | 24.7 | 3 | 32.4 | 4 | 30.4 | 4 | |
| Bürger für Ebringen (Citizens for Ebringen) | 24.5 | 3 | 30.3 | 4 | 26.3 | 3 | 23,3 | 3 | 21.6 | 3 | 16.1 | 2 | 16.5 | 2 | |
| Frauenliste (Women's List) | 22.0 | 3 | 29.8 | 3 | 21.6 | 3 | 17.2 | 2 | 18.2 | 2 | 14.3 | 2 | 7.8 | 1 | |
| Perspektive für Ebringen (Perspective for Ebringen) | - | - | - | - | 12.0 | 1 | 8.9 | 1 | 8.0 | 1 | - | - | - | - | A |
| SPD (Socialdemocratic Party of Germany) | - | - | - | - | - | - | - | - | - | - | 7,1 | 0 | 12.2 | 1 | |

Notes

A: In the election of 2004 and 2009 as FDP/DVP. List merged in 2019 with Bürgerliste.

After the election in 2024 women's share in the council stayed at 50%, as it was since autumn 2017. After the election of 2014 women's share was at five councillors (42%), like in the election of 2009. Like 2013 and 2014 women's share climbed in autumn 2017 at 6 (50%), as a woman succeeded a retired male councillor. After the election of 1989 there's been only one woman in a council with ten seats.

=== Mayors ===
- since 2022 Hans-Peter Widmann
- 2006-2022 Rainer Mosbach
- 1990–2006 Hans-Joerg Thoma
- 1963–1990 Eugen Schueler
- 1947–1962 Otto Missbach
- 1945-1947 Max Alfons Zimmermann (again)
- 1942-1945 Alois Weißer
- 1933–1942 Josef Franz
- 19??-1933 Max Alfons Zimmermann
- 1904-19?? Josef Bechtold
- 1892–1904 Julius Schueler
- 18??-1892 Alois Linsenmeier
- 1877-1880 Johann Maenner
- 1860-18?? Sebastian Schueler
- 1825–1860 Aloys Mayer (title up to 1832 Vogt, German pronunciation: [foːkt])
- ~1780-1794 Joseph Linsenmeier

For the results of elections see Ebringen/elections

== History ==
Ebringen is known for the oldest recorded viticulture between Freiburg and Basel east of the Rhine River, although there is archaeological evidence for viticulture having been introduced in the region by the Romans sometime in the first century AD.

Ebringen is mentioned next to an Openwilare in a donation of vineyards and farmland to the Monastery of St Gall: "Propterea vernacula terra juris mei in loco qui dicitur Openwilare, Tradimus sancto Galloni viginti juchos, et in Eberingen unum Juchum de vinea." The document dates from a 16 January in the reign of the Frankish king Chilperic II, who reigned from June 715 to February 721. No year is given and only a ruling king Chilperic is mentioned. The reign of Chilperic I (561-584) can be ruled out, since at that time the monastery of St Gall did not exist. There have not been any more Chilperics, so the date can be limited to the period between 716 and 721. The political situation in Francia makes the assumption of an origin in the year 720 most likely.

The neighbouring villages Pfaffenweiler and Wolfenweiler both claim to be identical with Openwilare. That's not likely and current scientific consensus sees in Openwilare an abandoned hamlet in northern Schneckental halfway between Wolfenweiler and Pfaffenweiler.

The donation of 720 is the first recorded donation of land to the Monastery of St Gall. So Ebringen marks both the beginning and the end of the Monastery of St Gall, as it was in 1805 also the abbey's last territory.

=== Before 720 ===
The oldest traces of settlement in Ebringen have been found on the summit plateau of the (Mount) Schönberg. These are dated to the Neolithic Age (approx. 3000 BC).

No archaeological remains are known from the Celtic period.

In the first decades of the first century, the region became part of the Roman Empire. From these times, the remains of an estate have been found in Ebringen's territory with evidence of viticulture. In Talhausen, the remains of a building dated in the Roman period were discovered during construction work in the 2010s.

After 260 the Alamanni invaded the region, which however remained under Roman influence until the end of the 5th century.

The origins of Ebringen go back to this time. On the one hand because of the ending -ingen in the place name. Ebringen means "place of the Ebro". On the other hand, the Alamanni created a cemetery of row graves in the area of today's industrial area in the southwest of the town. This cemetery was used until around 700, the time when Ebringen was first mentioned in writing.

=== 8th century – 1349: first St Gall rule ===
From the first mention about 720 Ebringen was under influence of the abbey of Saint Gall in today's Switzerland.

In a record of 817 Talhausen is mentioned for the first time.

About 868 St Gall got the full direct secular rule over Ebringen, while the abbey St Trudpert in nearby Muenstertal maintained ecclesiastical rule for a couple of decades.

In a record of 968 Berghausen is mentioned for the first time.

While Berghausen and Talhausen have been integrated into the secular St Gall rule over Ebringen, they remained under the ecclesiastical rule of St Trudpert. On the other hand, St Gall got sometime after 900 also the ecclesiastical rule over Ebringen.

In 1207 St. Gall became an independent (immediate) principality, over which the abbots ruled as territorial sovereigns ranking as Princes (prince-abbots) of the Holy Roman Empire.

In the first half of the 13th century Ebringen became the centre of the St Gall administration in the Breisgau region. Before then, St Gall's administration of its Breisgau possessions had been located in Wittnau, 5 km (3 miles) east of Ebringen in the Hexental between Schoenberg and the Black Forest. But in the 13th century the influence of the abbey in the Breisgau declined. Direct rule was replaced by fiefs in the hands of aristocrats, leaving only Ebringen under the direct rule of the abbey in the 14th century.

In 1312 the Schneeburg (Schneeberg Castle) on the western summit of the Schoenberg is mentioned for the first time, owned by the Lords of Hornberg. At this time the castle's territory on the Schoenberg was independent from Ebringen.

=== 1349–1621: aristocratic rule, Ebringen as a fief of St Gall ===
Today's Ebringen territory was split before 1349 into the villages of Ebringen, Talhausen, Berghausen and the (Mount) Schoenberg with the Schneeberg, all with unclear borders. During the aristocratic rule those territories became united and the borders were defined.

In the summer of 1349 - when the Black Death reached both St Gall and the Breisgau - about 25 - 50% of all people died. The casualties in Ebringen were not reported or the records were lost. As in the middle of the 14th century the financial situation of the abbey St Gall was strained, from time to time abbot Hermann von Bonstetten sold estates, benefices and properties of the abbey. In this context on 9 November 1349 the provostship of Ebringen was transformed into a fief of St Gall, ruled by an aristocrat. Werner von Hornberg donated his property Schneeburg Castle and Schoenberg to the abbey St Gall. In return, the abbey gave it back to him as a fief, together with direct rule over Ebringen, Talhausen and Berghausen. So the main part of the Schoenberg became part of Ebringen's territory. The fief also included the abbey's other easements and properties in the Breisgau, so the contract with Werner von Hornberg marks the end of St Gall's direct rule in the Breisgau. It was a contract to their mutual benefit. Werner von Hornberg needed an ally against the claims of Freiburg's nobility on the Schoenberg. St Gall wasn't able to maintain direct rule in a distant territory any longer and needed the support of a local noble family.

In the second half of the 14th century, the House of Habsburg, the Austrian dynasty originating in the region, appeared as territorial suzerain in the Breisgau. This means that probably sometime in the late 14th century Ebringen became a mediate Austrian territory.

In 1430 the municipal border between Wolfenweiler and Ebringen was decided by arbitration, except for the (Mount) Hohfirst. However, only very few landmarks have been set, so the exact boundary remained disputed in many places.

About 1450 the hamlet Berghausen was abandoned except for some isolated dwellings which may have existed there until the Thirty Years' War.

Based on a document of 1331 and urged by his Pfaffenweiler subjects, in 1457 the Lord of Staufen claimed Talhausen and Berghausen for Pfaffenweiler from Konrad von Hornberg. Pfaffenweiler had only a very small territory. As Berghausen's church once belonged to the monastery St Trudpert - from which the Lord of Staufen was the protector - Pfaffenweiler saw the opportunity to expand its territory. Being Talhausen and Berghausen part of Pfaffenweiler's territory, the Mount Hohfirst with its forest and meadows would have been also in most parts in Pfaffenweiler's possession. But the Austrian bailiff Peter von Moersberg ruled in favour of Konrad von Hornberg.

In 1469 Ebringen's Lord Hans von Ems (Ebs) is mentioned as a knight of the Austrian Breisgau.

In 1478 the Lord of Staufen claimed again Talhausen, Berghausen and Schneeberg Castle for Pfaffenweiler at the court for estates in Ensisheim. But the action was dismissed in all respects. The court confirmed Talhausen, Berghausen and Schneeburg as a fief of St Gall. In the 1480s the Lord of Staufen appealed directly to Emperor Frederic III, who delegates the case to a Breisgau court. There the case was finally decided against Staufen and Pfaffenweiler.

In many regions of Central Europe the anniversary of the inauguration of the church has been celebrated for centuries in combination with a wine and beer festival, which is known in the US as kermesse and in the UK as Church Ale. During Ebringen's kermesse on 16 August 1495 a mass brawl took place between alcoholized men of Ebringen and Freiburg after a Freiburg journeyman accidentally knocked over a bench. During the brawl a Freiburg citizen died. As a consequence a few days later 700 Freiburg citizens went to Ebringen for revenge. The Ebringers fled, so the Freiburgers plundered only wine. As a further consequence, Freiburg prohibited access to its market for Ebringers. The revenge campaign of Freiburg was considered a breach of peace and illegal by the government, so the dispute ended in a comparison by the bailiff of Anterior Austria on 30 October 1495.

About 1533 Christopher von Falkenstein became Lord of Ebringen. He was also bailiff of Anterior Austria in Ensisheim and therefore the most important aristocrat between Basel and Strasbourg.

In 1556 the Reformation was introduced in Wolfenweiler. As parts of the lower village and of Talhausen belonged to the parish of Wolfenweiler, this would have led to a confessional split. Based on the Augsburg Settlement, on 2 November 1556 Christopher von Falkenstein forbade the worshipers to attend the worship services in Wolfenweiler under threat of physical punishment. This also meant, that from then on the parish and the municipality of Ebringen became the same.

When Christopher von Falkenstein died in 1559, his nephew Hans Wolf von Bodman inherited the rule over Ebringen. The Bodman family had most of its possessions located in the region of Lake Constance, so the municipality took advantage of the situation, that the landlord lived far away. In 1560 a new local ordinance was negotiated, which expanded the rights of the commoners and reduced the rights of the nobility, in particular with regard to corvée labour and other forms of socage and the usage of the forests and the vineyards.

Because the exact borderline between Wolfenweiler and Ebringen was more and more disputed, after arbitration in 1563 the demarcation was defined exactly by more landmarks, including the Mount Hohfirst

In 1565 Ebringen's borders with Bollschweil and Soelden were also determined. So the Ebringen area mainly acquired its present shape.

In 1582 Austria adopted the Gregorian calendar like most other catholic territories in the Holy Roman Empire, so the new calendar was introduced in Ebringen. The Protestant territories still used the Julian calendar. So from then on the official date differed by ten days between Ebringen and its neighbouring village Wolfenweiler.

In 1584 Ebringen suffered an outbreak of the plague.

==== Ruling aristocrats and noble families ====
The aristocrats ruled in most of the time by a governor and lived normally out of Ebringen.

von Hornberg 1349-1458
1349 - ~1370 Werner von Hornberg
~1370 - bef. 1402 Ulrich von Hornberg, son of Werner von Hornberg
bef. 1402 - 1408 Brun Werner von Hornberg, son of Ulrich von Hornberg
1408 - 1419 Bertold S(ch)newlin, brother-in-law of Brun Werner von Hornberg
1419 - 1426 Konrad Dietrich von Ratsamhausen, father of Beningosa von Ratsamhausen
1426 - 1458 Konrad von Hornberg, son of Brun Werner, married with Beningosa von Ratsamhausen
1458 Beningosa von Ratsamhausen, widow of Konrad von Hornberg, died about 1469
von Ems 1458-1499
1458 - ~1490 Hans von Ems, second husband of Beningosa von Ratsamhausen
~1490 - 1499 Joerg von Ebenstein, son-in-law of Hans von Ems and his widow
von Falkenstein 1499-1559
1499 - ~1533 Sigmund von Falkenstein, second husband of Joerg von Ebenstein's widow Helena von Hohenems
~1533 - 1559 Christopher von Falkenstein
von Bodman 1559-1580
1559 - 1561 Hans Wolf von Bodman, nephew of Christopher von Falkenstein
1561 - 1580 Ludwig von Bodman zu Bodman
von Hohenlandenberg 1580-1621
1580 - 1588 Hugo Gerwig von Hohenlandenberg
1588 - 1621 Hans Dietrich von Hohenlandenberg

=== 1621–1807: second St Gall rule ===
Also during the second St Gall rule Ebringen was a part of Anterior Austria and thus a mediate St Gall territory in the Holy Roman Empire. Most of the abbey's Swiss territories were immediate and associated with the Old Swiss Confederacy. The first half of the second St Gall rule was characterized by frequent French attacks on the Breisgau. During the French invasions and the French occupations of Freiburg, Ebringen was regularly sacked by French troops. The second St Gall rule was, despite notable emigration, also an age of immigration of new families especially after 1713, when French interventions in the Breisgau became rare, of continuous population growth. The population doubled from about 500 after the end of the Thirty Years' War in 1648 at exactly 1000 in the census of 17 February 1792.

As a consequence of the Thirty Years' War and its high civilian losses, warfare in Central Europe became much more regulated in the following century. In the era of the cabinet wars between 1648 and 1789 the opponents tried to spare the civilian population. Plundering was often a kind of confiscation, as the people got the opportunity to redeem their property from the looters. Excesses against civilians and destructions of buildings became rare or at least less brutal. Nevertheless, less brutal is a relative term. Ebringen has been sacked quite often in the century after the Thirty Years' War, mostly by French mercenaries, but also by Austrian troops.

==== Local political system ====
In the Holy Roman Empire the respective rights and duties of the nobility, clergy and commoners were strict and regulated in detail. The rights and the duties of the municipality of Ebringen were defined by treaties between the municipality and the ruling nobility or clergy, court decisions, traditional rights and duties and Austrian and St Gall law. This system had the character of a local constitution. The revised version of 1560 was valid until the end of the St Gall rule and in some parts up to the introduction of the Badische Gemeindeordnung in 1832.

During the second St Gall rule Ebringen was a domain of the Princely Abbey and was integrated into its political system. But unlike the abbey's Swiss territories, Ebringen remained part of Anterior Austria under Austrian supremacy. Austria was among other things responsible for the legislative, the high courts and for defence and had the right to levy taxes. The St Gall rule was formally secular. The governor ruled as Knight of Ebringen and Norsingen. As a knight he was part of the nobility, not of the clergy of the territorial estates of Anterior Austria, the so-called Breisgauer Landstaende.

The local St Gall authorities, headed by the governor, were the supreme local executive, representing both the secular and ecclesiastical power. They were appointed directly by the Abbey of St Gall, independently from the Austrian government. The citizens were until 1782 de jure serfs of St Gall. During the second St Gall rule this meant, that the people had to pay local taxes instead of a corvée of three days per year, as corvée labour wasn't very efficient. Other forms of socage were still in use. In official documents the term Leibeigener (serf) was more and more replaced by Burger (citizen).

The citizens were organized in the municipality of Ebringen, headed by a vogt (German pronunciation: [foːkt], derived from Latin advocatus). All municipal officials including the vogt were appointed by the governor in his own right. The municipality had self-government in matters that concerned the citizens themselves. This included both administration and civil jurisdiction. The court was the supreme municipal institution. The court consisted of twelve judges and the vogt as its chairman. The court also had some functions of a municipal council.

During the aristocratic rule the ruling noble families changed quite often, so the municipality tried with some success to expand the rights of the commoners and the municipality and to reduce the rights of the nobility and clergy. When St Gall took over Ebringen in 1621, the local ordinance of 1560 remained valid.

Between 1760 and 1785 Emperor Joseph II attempted to legislate a series of drastic reforms to remodel Austria in the form of the ideal Enlightened state. The josephinism with compulsory schooling, end of villeinage, reform of justice etc. also affected Ebringen as a mediate Austrian territory under direct St Gall rule. The reforms centralized the administration and legislation and reduced the rights of the local authorities.

==== Religious and social life ====
In the second St Gall rule Ebringen was a catholic village, no other cult was allowed, unlike in the Princely Abbey's Swiss territories, where the abbey also had to allow the Protestant cult. This formally ended in 1781 when the Patent of Toleration extended religious freedom to non-Catholic Christians in Austria.

In family law it was common at least until the end of the St. Gall rule, that wives kept their maiden name for life, but legitimate children received the family name of their father. Deeds of ownership, church records, the census of 1792 and also Ildefons von Arx in his chronicle mention wives and widows always with their birth name, sometimes referring to their husbands with wife of.

==== Chronology ====
On 21 November 1621 the Abbey of St Gall bought back the undivided rule over Ebringen for 71,800 guilders from Hans Dietrich von Hohenlandenberg. The very next day the first St Gall officials arrived. Norsingen, 5 km (3 mi) southwest of Ebringen, had been under direct St Gall rule again since 1607. Ebringen again became the centre of the St Gall administration in the Breisgau. The abbey's possessions consisted of the direct rule over Ebringen and Norsingen and easements and properties in other locations in the Breisgau. Ebringen was next to St Gall, Wil, Rorschach and Neu St. Johann residence of a governor of the Princely Abbey.

In 1622 bailiff Georg Buol got the right to hold the blood court by the Prince-Abbot. The self-administration of the blood court inflicting corporal punishment, including the death penalty, was an important factor of imperial immediacy. So this act indicates a highly independent status of Ebringen from the Austrian suzerain.

In 1629 Ebringen was hit by the later so called Italian plague.

In 1630 Sweden intervened in the Thirty Years' War and soon after, the fighting also reached the Breisgau. Towards the end of 1632 Swedish troops occupied Freiburg. In 1633 Friedrich Ludwig Kanoffsky (1592-1645) from Bohemia became commander of the Swedish garrison. Sweden was allied with the Margravate of Baden-Durlach, the predecessor of the later Grand-Duchy of Baden, which ruled over Ebringen's neighbouring villages Wolfenweiler and Schallstadt.

In early June 1633 Austrian troops from Breisach had devastated some villages of the Margravate between Freiburg and Basel. In return on 19 June 1633 allied Swedish-Baden troops, massacred more than 300 people of Ebringen's neighbouring Austrian villages Pfaffenweiler, Oehlinsweiler, Kirchhofen and Ehrenstetten at Kirchhofen's manor house. In October 1633 Spanish troops ousted the Swedish occupants and returned Freiburg to Austria.

In 1637 the St Gall administration left Ebringen due to the very insecure situation in the war. Also most of Ebringen's people left the village and fled to the Sundgau, to Switzerland and to villages in the Black Forest. Most of the buildings in Talhausen - 30 houses were reported for the time before 1630 - and the last dwellings of Berghausen had been destroyed in the Swedish War. The Schoenberghof (today ''Unterer Schoenberghof''), a farmyard, with its fields was abandoned. In the following decades, a forest grew up there.

In 1638 Freiburg was occupied by a French-allied army under Bernard of Saxe-Weimar. Freiburg got a system of fortifications which included parts of Ebringen's territory on the Schoenberg. Friedrich Kanoffsky, who served now for Weimar, again became commander of the garrison. Bernard established a Duchy in the Breisgau, making Breisach its capital. After Bernard of Saxe-Weimar died in 1639, France took control over the territory of its former ally. Commander Kanoffsky didn't accept the French claim for sovereignty over Freiburg at first.

In 1640 Commander Kanoffsky took control over Ebringen, claiming it as personal property, ignoring all appeals of St Gall to return Ebringen to the abbey. Appeals of the Swiss Confederacy to the French court to reinstate St Gall rule remained fruitless until 1646.

In 1642 Kanoffsky eventually had to accept French sovereignty over Freiburg.

In summer 1644 Bavarian troops regained Freiburg for the Holy Roman Empire. Kanoffsky and his garrison were permitted to withdraw to Breisach. France tried to recapture the city soon after. While French troops set up camp on the Batzenberg, 3 km (2 mi) south west of Ebringen, waiting for additional troops, Bavarian troops fortified the Bohl, the western foothill of the Schoenberg, just about 0,5 km (0,3 mi) above Ebringen.

On 3 August 1644 French troops captured Bohl hill in an uphill battle, despite high casualties (about 1000 losses on the French side, 200 on the Bavarian side). Heavy rain interrupted the French attack on Freiburg, so the Bavarian defenders had time enough to reallocate their troops at the Schlierberg (now Lorettoberg) on the other side of the Schoenberg, where the Battle of Freiburg was continued on 5 and 9 August. The French troops did not manage to recapture Freiburg. The remains of the fallen soldiers were buried around the battlefield in makeshift mass graves close beneath the surface. Today a cross, the Schlachtenkreuz, commemorates the battle.

In 1646, two years after the Bohl battle and one year after Kanoffsky's death, the St Gall administration returned to Ebringen. In the following years many of the refugees returned also to Ebringen.

In 1648, shortly before the war ended, Ebringen was sacked by the French garrison of Breisach. The manor house was not sacked, as it was protected by a salva guardia for 264 guilders, which was respected. The people fled to Todtnau in the Black Forest and so they were not harmed. The damage was moderate. As a consequence of the war Austria lost Sundgau and Ensisheim, the capital of Anterior Austria to France, so the government of Anterior Austria took seat in Freiburg, where the Ebringer Hof became the St Gall representation. In 1649 Prince-Abbot Pius of St Gall visited Ebringen.

In 1661 Prince-Abbot Gallus Alt, 1646/47 Governor of Ebringen, visited the village.

Because the mass graves on the Bohl battlefield were very close to the surface, human remains were uncovered over and over again by erosion. Finally about 1674 the bones of the soldiers, fallen in the Bohl battle of 1644, were collected by Peter Jenne. They were buried all together in an ossuary near the present-day Schlachtenkreuz. The ossuary became a place of pilgrimage, where over and over again bones were stolen as relics. Peter Jenne immigrated a few years before and became the forefather of all Jennes in Ebringen.

During the Franco-Dutch War (1672-1678) in 1674 the Princely Abbey St Gall allied with France against Austria. Several thousand St Gall citizens became mercenaries in the French army. As a consequence, Emperor Leopold ordered Ebringen - which was surrounded by the emperor's Austrian territories - to be treated like enemy territory. After Governor Leodegar Buergisser ignored the summons to Freiburg by the Austrian administration, Ebringen was sacked by Austrian troops from 16 to 18 October 1676. The soldiers confiscated wine, cereals, fruits and livestock. They damaged the houses, the mill, the manor house and the church. The estimated damage amounted to about 20,000 guilders. Moreover, women were raped, one of them died. The abbey was also faced to be stripped of its prestigious status as immediate imperial abbey, while consequently the abbot would lose his title as prince-abbot. In consequence, the abbey gave up its alliance with France, called home its mercenaries in the French army and allied with Austria - unlike the rest of the Swiss Confederacy, which stayed allied with France. So the abbey was politically isolated in Switzerland, one of the causes of the Toggenburg War of 1712.

The new alliance did not improve the situation of St Gall's Breisgau possessions, as France occupied Freiburg in 1677 and the region was from then on de facto French controlled. The government of Anterior Austria was moved to Waldshut. Most of Ebringen's people left the village between November 1677 and summer 1678 and returned in 1679 after the Treaties of Nijmegen. In these treaties Freiburg became also de jure a part of France.

The church records for 1678/79 listed only nine baptisms, no marriages and no deaths. In 1678 the forest at the Herrenbuck, south of the Schoenberg summit, was felled for the French fortification of Freiburg by Sébastien Le Prestre de Vauban. Allegedly oak logs worth 20,000 guilders were taken. The vintage of 1678 was robbed by French mercenaries. In 1679 the vineyards lay fallow.

In 1689 the new forest around the Schoenberghof was cut down, the yard rebuilt, the area became farmland again.

In 1697 France had to make restitution of Freiburg to Austria in the Treaty of Ryswick and the government of Anterior Austria returned to Freiburg.

In 1700 the Protestant territories in the Holy Roman Empire finally adopted the Gregorian calendar, so the date confusion between Ebringen and its Protestant neighbour villages ended.

In the War of the Spanish Succession (1701–14) France attacked the Austrian Breisgau. Ebringen's old manor house was sacked on 8 April 1703 by French mercenaries despite a salva guardia. The plunderers killed two men from Ebringen, who tried to resist them. So the people fled into the Schoenberg forest. From 1705 to 1709 the war was fought in other areas all over Europe, but then the fighting returned to the Breisgau.

In 1705 Lukas Grass became St Gall governor of Ebringen. Grass visited Naples in 1700 noting in his diary the famous sentence Vedi Napoli e poi muori (I've seen Naples, now I can die), 87 years before Goethe noted the same in his Italian Journey. During his rule, Grass strengthened the power of the local St. Gall authorities against both the political community and the Austrian suzerain.

In 1710 the Schoenberghof was sold for 1,500 guilders and an annual interest payment to Matthias Zimmermann from Horben as hereditary fief.

Since Ebringen was often sacked since its return to St Gall, it was obviously a loss-making business for the abbey. So the Abbot and former Ebringen Governor Leodegar Buergisser, who reigned over the abbey 1696 - 1717, considered selling it. But due to the political isolation of the abbey in Switzerland after its alliance with Austria, Governor Grass convinced Buergsisser instead to strengthen St Gall's presence in the Breisgau.

So in spite of the war going on, between 1711 and 1713 a new manor house - the Schloss, today's Town Hall - was built as a representative office of the St Gall governor, which replaced the old one. The area of the manor house was relatively safe from being plundered by a salva guardia, and because of the war, labour was cheap. In the words of annalist Ildefons von Arx the project is described like a modern economic recovery programme, while the people of Ebringen and Norsingen saw it more like an exploitation of distress and poverty.

In September 1713 French troops besieged Freiburg again and plundered the surrounding area, including Ebringen. Many valuables had been brought into the Ebringer Hof, the St Gall office in Freiburg, for presumed safety. Fortified by Vauban, Freiburg was thought to be safe from being occupied. But after a siege of three weeks Freiburg surrendered and was sacked, also the Ebringer Hof. In Ebringen houses - inter alia the Schoenberghof - were burnt down. Almost all metal was looted by the French mercenaries. So in the autumn of 1713 many people left the village and fled to the French Sundgau. Most of them returned in 1714 after the Treaty of Rastatt.

There was not only war. Confrontation also arose in Ebringen between the St Gall administration and the citizens. The construction of the manor house in a time of war upset many people. Worse still, Governor Lukas Grass ruled in many respects in an absolutist manner. But meanwhile, in 1712 the Abbey had lost all of its Swiss territory in the Toggenburg War. In May 1712 Abbot Buergisser was exiled to Neuravensburg, the abbey's territory north of Lake Constance in the Holy Roman Empire, where he died in 1717. So the abbey's position in Ebringen was also very weak, but Governor Grass' position in the abbey's hierarchy was very powerful, as he now ruled the only area controlled by the abbey besides Neuravensburg. The abbot sent Lukas Grass to Vienna in July 1712 for negotiations with the Austrian government to help the abbey regain its possessions. Grass returned soon after without substantial success. But 25 citizens of Ebringen took advantage of the abbey's disastrous situation in Switzerland and Grass' absence. They sued the St Gall administration in the court for provincial estates of Anterior Austria against the rights of local authorities towards the people. Governor Grass was not willing to compromise and eventually won the case. In 1714 the citizens of Ebringen had to accept villeinage in a declaration of submission under St Gall rule. Governor Lukas Grass had also expanded the jurisdiction of the abbey, as the declaration states St Gall as first instance of jurisdiction in all matters between citizens and local authorities. This judicium primae instantiae was a unique privilege of all Breisgauer Landstaende in the Austrian law system. As s in future a lawsuit like the one of 1712 would have to be held in St Gall, not in an Austrian court, the submission drastically reduced Austrian control over Ebringen. The court for provincial estates in Anterior Austria confirmed the declaration of submission on 24 January 1715.

In 1718 the rule of the Princely Abbey of St Gall in Switzerland was restored after the Treaty of Baden and the new Prince-Abbot Joseph von Rudolphi returned from Neuravensburg to St Gall.

On 16 January 1720 the St Gall governor and the capitular celebrated Ebringen's millennium - while the celebration of 1300 years took place in 2016.

Around 1740 the cultivation of Chasselas, a white wine originating from western Switzerland, is noted for Ebringen's vineyards. This type of wine brought significantly higher quantitative yields than traditional varieties like Elbling. So Chasselas soon became the preferred cultivated variety in the vineyards.

In 1743 parish priest Benedikt Mueller tried to introduce compulsory schooling. He established a school foundation to allow free school attendance. Before, the parents had to pay the teacher, so children of poor parents often received no school education.

In 1744 French troops, commanded by King Louis XV himself, captured Freiburg after a siege of six weeks in the War of the Austrian Succession. French cavalry occupied Ebringen during the siege. Unlike previous occupations there were no excesses against civilians and no rape is reported. So the people didn't leave the village. Although the people were not harmed by the troops, this was not the case for their property. The vineyards were vandalized, as the troops used the wooden sticks in the vineyards for heating. Also two houses were destroyed by infantry before the cavalry reached the village. The troops quartered themselves in the houses of the village. The inhabitants had to move to the attics of their houses. The Duke of Chartres stayed in the manor house. Unlike Freiburg, which suffered a famine during the siege, food supply in Ebringen was good all the time. The French occupation of 1744 was the last one until the French revolution in the 1790s.

In 1745, the municipality planned to sell its Biezighofen Forest in the Black Forest for 21,000 guilders to repay debts. The sale only failed because of disagreement on some secondary points. About 250 years later, the municipality tried again for the same reasons, and again the sale failed. On 11 July the same year Prince-Abbot Coelestin Gugger von Staudach visited Ebringen.

In 1748, the Hohbannstein was erected, a landmark with five neighbouring municipalities south of the Hohfirst summit.

In 1749, the diocese of Constance and the Abbey of St. Gall made a comparison of their respective rights. The abbey was granted the right to appoint the parish priests in its territories, which included Ebringen. Formally St Gall belonged to the diocese of Constance, so the appointment of parish priests was normally the right of the bishop.

In the same year a chapel, the Berghauser Kapelle, was built in the area of the former village Berghausen.

In 1751, eight little chapels were built along the Steinweg, the pilgrim way between the churches of Ebringen and Berghausen. Before, there were 14 steles or crosses.

In 1770, the Austrian Princess Maria Antonia married the later French King Louis XVI, symbolizing a new alliance of France and Austria after 250 years of antagonism. This promised a period of peace for the region, which was for more than a century a battleground between both countries. Maria Antonia's journey from Vienna to Paris led via Freiburg, where she stayed from 4 to 6 May 1770. For this, the road from Donaueschingen through the Black Forest to Freiburg had been significantly improved. This opened new markets for Ebringen's wine and led to a higher income for Ebringen's winegrowers.

In 1777, the Austrian government introduced compulsory schooling in Anterior Austria and its dependent territories, also in Ebringen.

On 1 July 1782 Johann Adam von Posch, Governor of Anterior Austria, abolished the right of the local authorities to the first instance of jurisdiction (judicium primae instantiae) and established a new common law system, the Vorderoesterreichische Landrechte. In Ebringen this act abolished the declaration of submission of 1715.

On 20 December 1782 villeinage was abolished in Anterior Austria. As in 1782 most forms of socage had been long transformed into monetary and natural levies, the local administration defined them now as local taxes, levies and compulsory service, so the effect of this reform was more psychological.

The St Gall authorities in Ebringen tried to ignore all these special decrees from Vienna and Freiburg as well as they could.

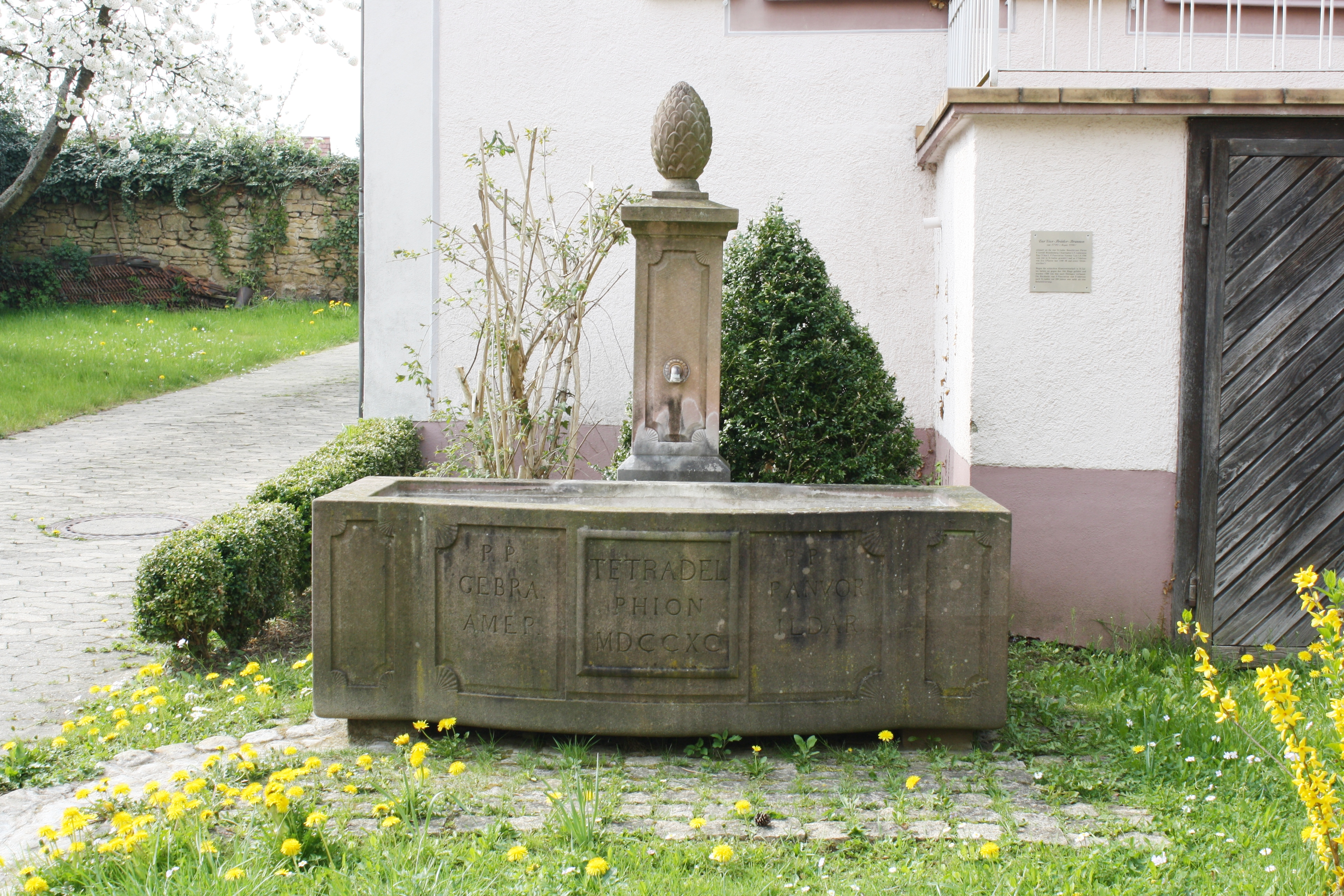
Tetradelphion Fountain at Ebringen's presbytery with the abbreviated names of the four exiled monks

1788/89 Prince-Abbot Beda Anghern sent four leading opponents - Ildefons von Arx, Gerald Brandenberg, Ambrosius Epp and Pankraz Vorster - to Ebringen. This act was formally only a relocation, as Ebringen was the seat of a governor, but because of Ebringen's distance from St Gall it was in fact an exile. Gerald Brandenberg became governor. Pankraz Vorster bought back the Schoenberghof from the Zimmermann family and built a new dairy farm in the meadows above Ebringen. Ildefons von Arx became parish priest. In 1792 he wrote the first book on the history of Ebringen - a main source of this article.

In 1795, Gerold Brandenberg became Governor of Rorschach and Beatus Schumacher became the new - and last - St Gall Governor of Ebringen. Schumacher was previously Governor of St Gall and lost this position through mismanagement. Although he retained his title, this was a relegation. As Governor of St Gall he was the most important governor, in Ebringen he only represented the abbot in a distant outpost and did not really rule, as he also lost the responsibility for economic affairs.

In 1796, Pankraz Vorster was reconciled with Beda Anghern and returned to St Gall. After Anghern's death Vorster succeeded him as Prince-Abbot in June 1796. In September 1796 Ildefons von Arx also returned to St Gall.

In 1798, the rule of the Princely Abbey of St Gall collapsed in Switzerland. On its former territory the new canton of Saentis was established. Although the abbey lost its political power, it kept its possessions. Ebringen with Norsingen and Neuravensburg, located in the Holy Roman Empire, remained as the sole dominions. Prince-Abbot Vorster left St Gall and went into exile. In 1801 Ebringen's manor house became his main residence in exile. In the same year, Austria lost the Breisgau to the Duke of Modena Ercole III (Hercules III) after the Treaty of Campo Formio, so Ebringen got a new suzerain. Ercole got his new territory as compensation for the loss of his Italian possessions, but he was not willing to accept it in the first time. So the region remained Austrian until April 1803. Ercole never visited his new duchy and died already in October 1803. Heir was the husband of his daughter Maria Beatrice, Ferdinand Charles of Austria, uncle of Emperor Francis, so the region remained Habsburgian - now ruled by the cadet branch Austria-Este - and de facto Austrian, as the new ruler lived at the imperial court in Vienna.

In the German mediatisation of 1803 the abbey St Gall lost Neuravensburg, so Ebringen and Norsingen were its last dominions. In Switzerland the canton of Saentis was dissolved in March 1803. Parts of it formed the new canton of St Gall. On 8 May 1805 the new canton dissolved the monastery of St Gall and confiscated its possessions. As Ebringen was situated in an Austrian controlled area, the canton wasn't able to do so in Ebringen. Vienna didn't accept St. Gall's claims for Ebringen and claimed Ebringen for itself. Only with regard to the abbot being in exile in Ebringen the direct local administration hadn't been taken over by Austria-Este, the canton was told. But in September 1805 Vorster left Ebringen when a French army threatened to invade the Breisgau. The canton of St Gall could take control over Ebringen, after a French army occupied the Breisgau in the same month. In the Peace of Pressburg of December 1805 the House of Habsburg and Austria also de jure lost control over the Breisgau. It was decided that the whole region should become part of the new Grand Duchy of Baden. Baden took over the rule on 15 April 1806. But the territorial status of some dominions in the Breisgau was disputed. Although Baden saw itself as suzerain, it respected St Gall's possession of Ebringen, while most other mediate territories were dissolved. So from his new exile in Vienna Pankraz Vorster tried to negotiate with the canton of St Gall, not with Baden, about his future, claiming a lifelong dominion over Ebringen. But the canton ignored this and sold Ebringen and Norsingen to members of the Grand Duke's family - not to the Grand Duchy - for 140,000 guilders. The dominion was handed over in March 1807.

==== St Gall administrators ====
St. Gall Prince Abbot in exile

- 1801-1805 Pankraz Vorster (Ebringen was residence in exile and together with Norsingen from 1803 the last territory of the Princely Abbey)

St. Gall Governors

- 1795–1806 Beatus Schumacher
- 1789–1795 Gerold Brandenberg
- 1778–1789 Anton Gerwig
- 1775–1778 Coelestin Schiess
- 1769–1775 Ignaz Moesl
- 1762–1769 Othmar Walser
- 1741–1762 Pirmin Widle
- 1731–1741 Augustin Hauser von Gleichenstein
- 1725–1731 Roman Schertlin
- 1704–1725 Lukas Grass
- 1698–1704 Hermann Schenk
- 1681–1698 Augustin Zagot
- 1675–1681 Leodegar Buergisser
- 1662–1675 Tutilo Gebel
- 1656–1662 Othmar Kessler
- 1654–1656 Simon von Freiburg
- 1648–1654 Ambrosius Negeli
- 1647–1648 Basilius Renner
- 1646–1647 Gallus Alt
- 1644-1646 without local authorities
- 1640-1644 rule of Friedrich Kanoffsky
- 1637–1640 without local authorities
- 1634–1637 Robert Bloed (again)
- 1633–1634 Hans Dietrich Mueller (only administrator, not governor)
- 1624–1633 Jakob Schepeli (only administrator, not governor)
- 1621–1624 Robert Bloed

=== 1807–1918: Ebringen in the Grand Duchy of Baden ===
While the 18th century was an age of population growth, despite notable emigration, the 19th century was the opposite: an age of massive emigration and stagnating or decreasing population.

Between 1807 and 1809 Ebringen together with Norsingen was an own dominion under the suzerainty of the Grand Duchy of Baden, in the possession of members of the Grand Duke's family. In 1809 the dominion was sold to the Grand Duchy and was fully integrated into the state of Baden.

Although the secular rule of the abbey St Gall ended in 1805, the parish priest and the vicar in Ebringen were still from the former abbey of St Gall. So in 1814 Aemilian Hafner, once a close advisor of Pankraz Vorster and since 1805 vicar of Ebringen, was appointed as parish priest. This was the last appointment of a St Gall parish priest. After Hafner was promoted to vicar general of the new diocese Chur-St Gall in 1824, in Ebringen the era of religious influence of St Gall also ended.

In September 1893 Talhausen got a water supply. At that time, from its own source.

In 1912, Ebringen and Talhausen were connected to the electricity grid.

=== since 1918 ===
In 1937/38, 211 plots of land on the Schoenberg were bought up by a middleman for the German Reich and a military training area of 1.5 km^{2} was set up for the Wehrmacht.

Since 1960 Talhausen gets its water supply from Ebringen, the main road was asphalted in the same year. But only the houses east of the Nussbach were also connected to the sewage system. In 1980, the houses west of the Nussbach were connected to the sewage system - the last ones in Ebringen, which were not connected.

On 1 January 1975 the municipality of Ebringen lost its independence. Together with Mengen, Ebringen became part of Schallstadt-Wolfenweiler. Ebringen was called officially now Schallstadt-Wolfenweiler 4. Pfaffenweiler should also be integrated, but remained independent. Therefore, Ebringen complained against the incorporation to Schallstadt-Wolfenweiler at the State Court of Baden-Wuerttemberg at the end of 1974. While Ebringen's mayor, Eugen Schueler, was dismissed and became only chairman (Ortsvorsteher) of the now powerless local council (Ortschaftsrat), the mayor of Schallstadt-Wolfenweiler, Oskar Hanselmann, became only local administrator (Amtsverweser) until the judgement of the court. On 6 February 1976 the case was decided. The incorporation was void from the beginning. Ebringen remained an own municipality. Mayor Eugen Schueler was reinstated.

== Demographics ==
=== Population ===
In 1574, a population of 560 people is recorded. Although outbreaks of the plague in 1584 and 1629 reduced the number of inhabitants, there was a remarkable population growth in the decades after the end of the Thirty Years' War in 1648 due to a birth surplus and immigration. On the other hand, the church records listed between 1620 and 1780 more than 4000 births, but only about 3000 deaths, so there must have been also a notable emigration. Until 1800 there was a continuous population growth, between 1800 and 1930 stagnation, and since 1930 again growth.

demographic vertical bar chart of between 1574 and 2017
Sources: 1574-1792 Ildefons von Arx, Geschichte der Herrschaft Ebringen, 1852-2017, Stat. Landesamt BW

==== Census of 1792 ====
In the census of 17 February 1792, 1000 people are listed, 2 churches, 148 houses, 208 families. 60 people lived in the hamlet Talhausen. The location of some houses is shown in this map, the table below shows the demographics. 32,5% of the inhabitants were below 15 years old, only 8.1% older than 60. 49 people are registered in Ebringen, but work and live outside. On the other hand, 25 people from outside work and live in Ebringen, who are not listed in the census. The ratio male to female is nearly equal. The table also reflects the high infant mortality as reported in the church records: 41 babies younger than one year, while in the group 1-4 only 73 children are listed.

population structure 1792 / 2011
| Age Group | year | % | change |
| ≥65 | 1792 | 4.5% | +12.0% |
| ≥65 | 2011 | 16.3% | +12.0% |
| 50-64 | 1792 | 14.4% | +7.8% |
| 50-64 | 2011 | 22.2% | +7.8% |
| 25-49 | 1792 | 30.7% | +4.8% |
| 25-49 | 2011 | 35.6% | +4.8% |
| 18-24 | 1792 | 11.4% | -3.1% |
| 18-24 | 2011 | 8.2% | -3.1% |
| 6-17 | 1792 | 24.6% | -12.6% |
| 6-17 | 2011 | 12.0% | -12.6% |
| 0-5 | 1792 | 13.6% | -8.0% |
| 0-5 | 2011 | 5.6% | -8.0% |
2011 and 1792 age structure in Ebringen compared.

Census of February 17, 1792
| Age | all | male | female |
|---|---|---|---|
| total | 1000 | 492 | 508 |
| 80-84 | 3 | 3 | 0 |
| 75-79 | 5 | 1 | 4 |
| 70-74 | 13 | 5 | 8 |
| 65-69 | 24 | 16 | 8 |
| 60-64 | 36 | 20 | 16 |
| 55-59 | 53 | 23 | 30 |
| 50-54 | 55 | 21 | 34 |
| 45-49 | 44 | 25 | 19 |
| 40-44 | 63 | 30 | 33 |
| 35-39 | 60 | 32 | 28 |
| 30-34 | 68 | 37 | 31 |
| 25-29 | 72 | 31 | 41 |
| 20-24 | 79 | 37 | 42 |
| 15-19 | 89 | 47 | 42 |
| 10-14 | 107 | 52 | 55 |
| 5-9 | 104 | 57 | 47 |
| 1-4 | 73 | 29 | 44 |
| 0 | 41 | 22 | 19 |
| unknown | 11 | 5 | 7 |

=== Religion ===
Between the reformation and the end of the rule of the Princely Abbey of St Gall in 1806 Ebringen's population was at least de jure all Roman Catholic, although the 1781 Patent of Toleration formally allowed other Christian cults. The Roman Catholic confession stayed dominant until the 1970s. Population growth due to immigration into new quarters and fewer religious ties decreased the Catholic share of the population to 55% at the end of 2014.

== Economy and Infrastructure ==
=== Local supply ===
Local supply with food and services decreased drastically in 2016, when at 29 December Ebringen's only supermarket was abandoned. While in 2014 Ebringen had one supermarket, one bakery, two butchers and one beverage market, at the beginning of 2017 there was only one bakery, one butcher and one beverage market.

=== Internet ===
Since October 2016, for most households in Ebringen VDSL2, in Talhausen ADSL2 is provided.

=== Viticulture ===
Viticulture has most likely been present since the Roman era in the first century AD, as ruins of a Roman grange were found in the Ebringen area. As mentioned above, the earliest written record for viticulture dates from the early 8th century. In 1770 an area is reported of 110 ha covered with vineyards, which shrank from the end of the century. In the first decade of the 21st century an area of 90 ha was covered with vineyards, which is slightly less than during the last three decades of the 20th century.

== Gallery ==
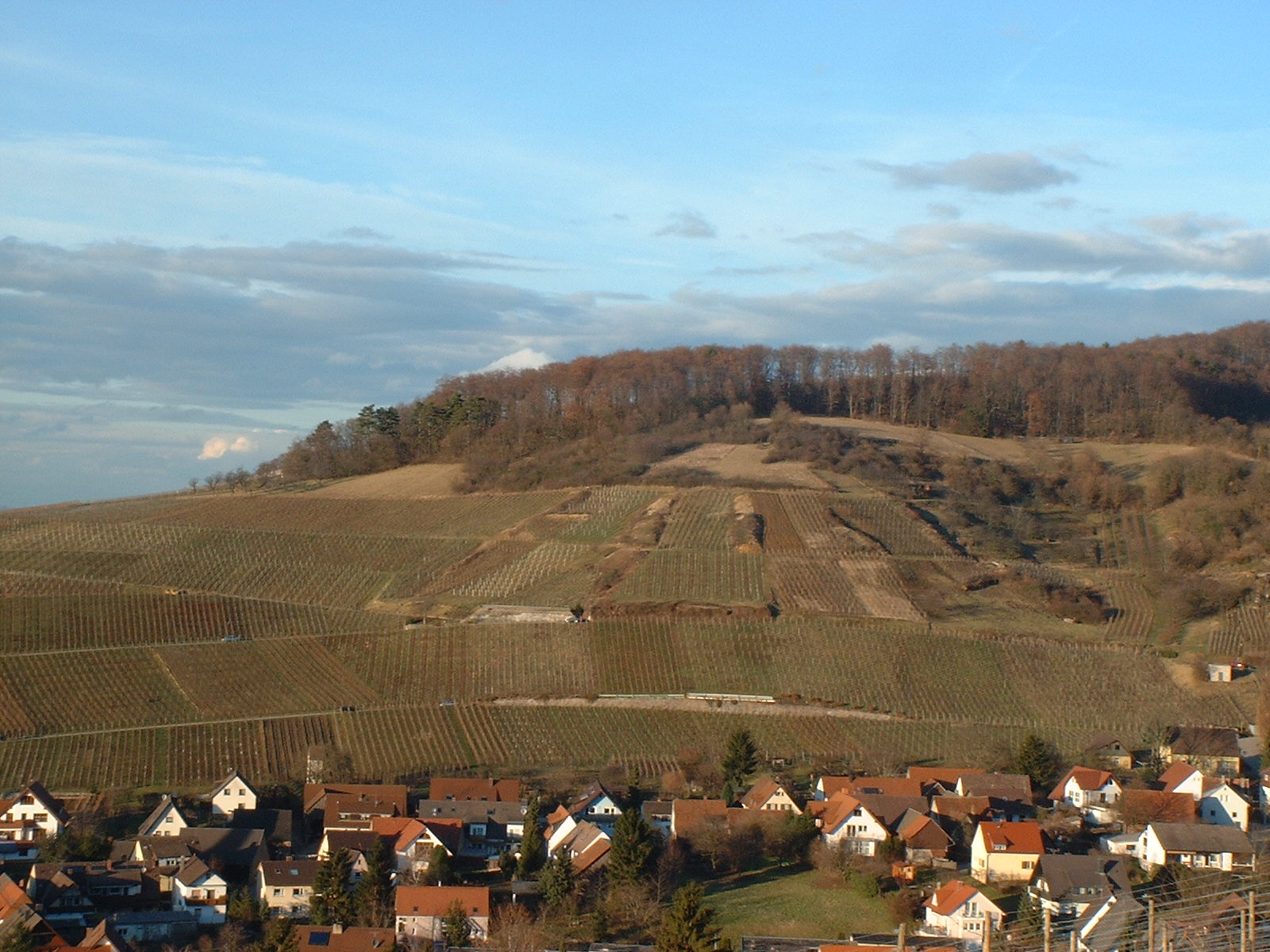
Bohl hill above Ebringen in February 2006: Place of the first day of the Battle of Freiburg in the Thirty Years' War on August 3, 1644

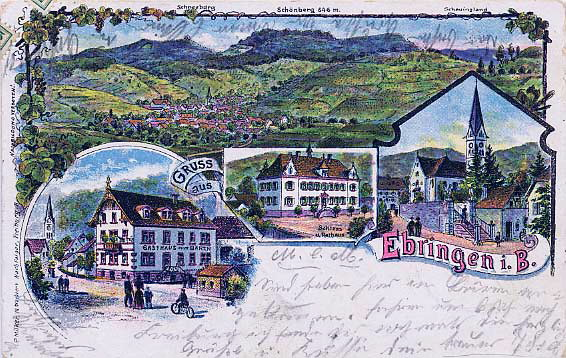
Ebringen in 1900

== Points of interest ==
=== Buildings ===
- Townhall (Schloss, the former St Gall manor house)
- Roman Catholic church St Gallus and Otmar
- Roman Catholic Berghausen chapel St Trudpert
- Ruin Schneeburg (Schneeberg Castle)

=== Nature reserves ===
- Jennetal
- Berghausen Meadows (Berghauser Matten)

== Notable residents ==
=== Honorary citizens ===
- Eugen Schüler, mayor from 1963 until 1990 (1922–2012, honorary citizen since 1991)
- Otto Goldschmidt (1918–2013, honorary citizen since 2002)

=== born in Ebringen ===
- Julius Schüler (1850–1914), mayor, Member of Parliament in Germany and Baden
- Alois Herth, 1853–1937, Member of Parliament in Baden, mayor of Furtwangen 1903–1919, honorary citizen of Furtwangen
- Franz Sales Kuhn (1864–1938), Architect, honorary citizen of Heidelberg

=== other residents ===
- Georg von Wildenstein († 1379)
- Gallus Alt (1610–1687)
- Pankraz Vorster (1753–1829)
- Ildefons von Arx (1755–1833)
- Norbert Ruf (1933–2012)
- Manfred Hermann (1937–2011)
- Natascha Thoma-Widmann (* 1971), German Wine Queen 1997/98, wife of mayor Widmann and daughter of mayor Thoma.
- Katrin Lang (* 1999), German Wine Queen 2022/23

== Bibliography ==
- Ebringen, Herrschaft und Gemeinde, Volume 1 - Claus-Dieter Schott and Edmund Weeger (Hrsg.), Rombach-Verlag Freiburg, ISBN 3-9802758-0-9 (in German)
- Helge Koerner: Der Schoenberg – Natur- und Kulturgeschichte eines Schwarzwald-Vorberges, Freiburg 2006. ISBN 3-935737-53-X. (in German)
