= 1802 Helvetic Republic constitutional referendum =

25 May 1802

Results
Choice	Votes	%
Yes	239,625	72.17%
No	92,423	27.83%
Valid votes	332,048	100.00%
Invalid or blank votes	0	0.00%
Total votes	332,048	100.00%
Registered voters/turnout	332,048	100%

A constitutional referendum was held in the Helvetic Republic on 25 May 1802. Unlike the constitution approved in 1798, the new constitution, known as the Malmaison constitution, did not provide for any referendums. Non-voters were assumed to have voted in favour of the new constitution, a measure put in place to prevent its rejection. As a result, 72.17% of voters were deemed to be in favour.

== Results ==
Choice	Votes	%
For	239,625	72.17
Against	92,423	27.83
Invalid/blank votes	0	–
Total	332,048	100
Registered voters/turnout	332,048	100
Source: Direct Democracy
