= Pankraz Vorster =

Swiss bishop

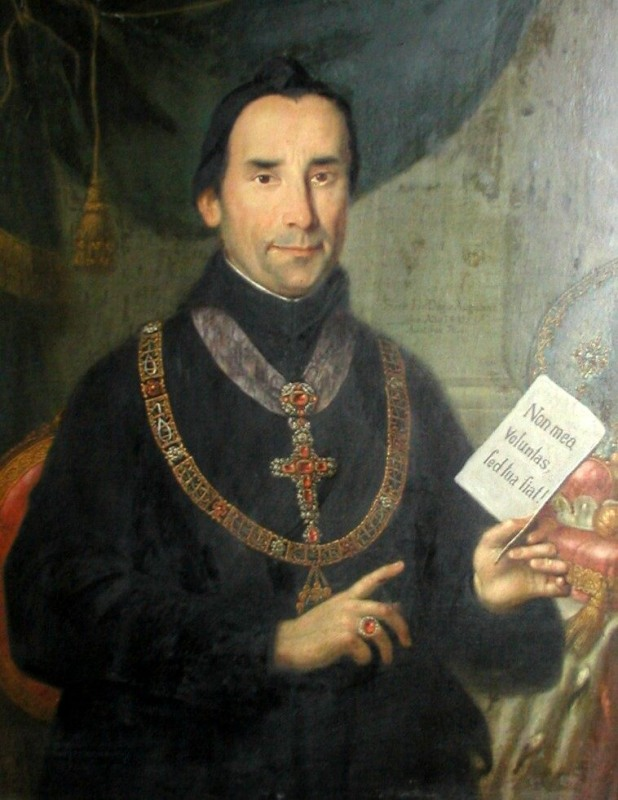
- Pankraz Vorster
- Born: 31 July 1753; Naples, Italy
- Died: 9 September 1829 (aged 76); Muri, Switzerland
- Occupation: Swiss-bishop

Pankraz Vorster (31 July 1753 – 9 September 1829) was a Swiss abbot. He served as the last abbot of the Abbey of Saint Gall, from 1796 to 1805.

== Early life ==
Pankraz Vorster was born in Naples to an old family from Fürstenland. He was the son of Captain Joseph Zacharias Vorster and Countess Anna Maria Rosa Berni. He was raised mainly by his uncle, who was a pastor in Grub and Wittenbach. In 1771, he completed his studies in St. Gallen. He taught Philosophy, Science and Theology at a school.

== Priest ==
On 13 July 1777, he was ordained as a priest. In 1784, he undertook a study trip with Johann Nepomuk Hauntinger to Swabia and Bavaria. In 1785, he led the opposition against Abbot Beda Angehrn. In the eyes of some monks he threatened the monastery's large investments and its autocratic administration. He was penalized and was moved in September 1788 as suboeconomus (vice governor) to Ebringen, a St Gall domain under Austrian suzerainty south of Freiburg im Breisgau. In 1796, Vorster reconciled with Angehrn and returned to St. Gallen.

== Abbot ==
On 4 June 1796, Vorster was elected abbot and supported the efforts for democracy in the monastery's dominions. In 1797, he conceded the region its own seal and ancient right of choice of a magistrate. On 3 February 1798, the chapter arbitrarily granted its subjects their independence, ending the monastery's secular rule. The previous Vogt of the Abbey in the County of Toggenburg, Karl von Müller-Friedberg, had arbitrarily dismissed the Counts of Toggenburg to independence on 1 January. On 14 February in Gossau, the Constituent Landsgemeinde of the Republic of Free St. Gallen met. Vorster moved to Neu-Ravensburg, an exclave north of Lake Constance, and formally raised a protest against his subjects' action on 3 March 1798.

=== Exile ===
After the French invasion of Switzerland, Vorster tried in vain to remove the Abbey from Switzerland with a proclamation on 9 June 1798, so as to rejoin the Holy Roman Empire. With the arrival of the troops of the coalition in St. Gallen, Vorster returned to the monastery on 26 May 1799, and began to rebuild the Dominion. He had to flee again on 29 September to Mehrerau after the defeat of the coalition at the Second Battle of Zurich.

Vorster exiled himself to Ebringen, in Austria's sphere of influence, which became the monastery's last ruled territory. From there, he worked continuously for the recovery of his monastery. He refused all offers to restore the monastery without sovereignty. In 1803, he sent an emissary to the Helvetic Republic and to the Consulta in Paris, to seek Napoleon's support for the restoration. The Act of Mediation decreed that all monasteries should be restored. However, Karl von Müller-Friedberg prevented restoration for St. Gallen because of Vorster's extensive demands and because the newly established canton would have endangered St. Gallen. Instead, Vorster received St. Gallen from the bishop of Basel, Franz Xaver von Neveu, on 4 November 1804 in Offenburg. Months later, the Great Council of the Canton of St. Gallen on 8 May 1805 approved the monastery's liquidation. Vorster left Ebringen in September 1805 to Vienna. Vorster was called "the gravedigger of his monastery" because he prevented any compromise.

In 1814–1815 Vorster personally asked the Congress of Vienna to recover his rule, but could only obtain a pension of 6000 florins, while the canton retained control of St. Gallen. Vorster unsuccessfully attempted, with the support of the pope, to get the affiliation of at least one Diocese of St. Gallen before the Federal Council at Tagsatzung on 16 July 1816. In the same year he moved to Arth.

=== Death ===
From 1819 he withdrew into the Muri Abbey, where he died in 1829. Formally, he remained the abbot of St. Gallen until his death, because from the perspective of the Catholic Church the monastery was only abolished in 1845. In 1923 his body was interred in the St. Gallen Cathedral.
