= Alte Landschaft =

In Swiss historiography, Alte Landschaft may refer to:

- The territory surrounding the city of St. Gallen owned by the Imperial Abbey of St. Gall before 1798, also known as Fürstenland
- Old Lands (Fribourg), the territory owned by the city of Fribourg before 1798
