= Schneeburg =

Castle ruin in Germany

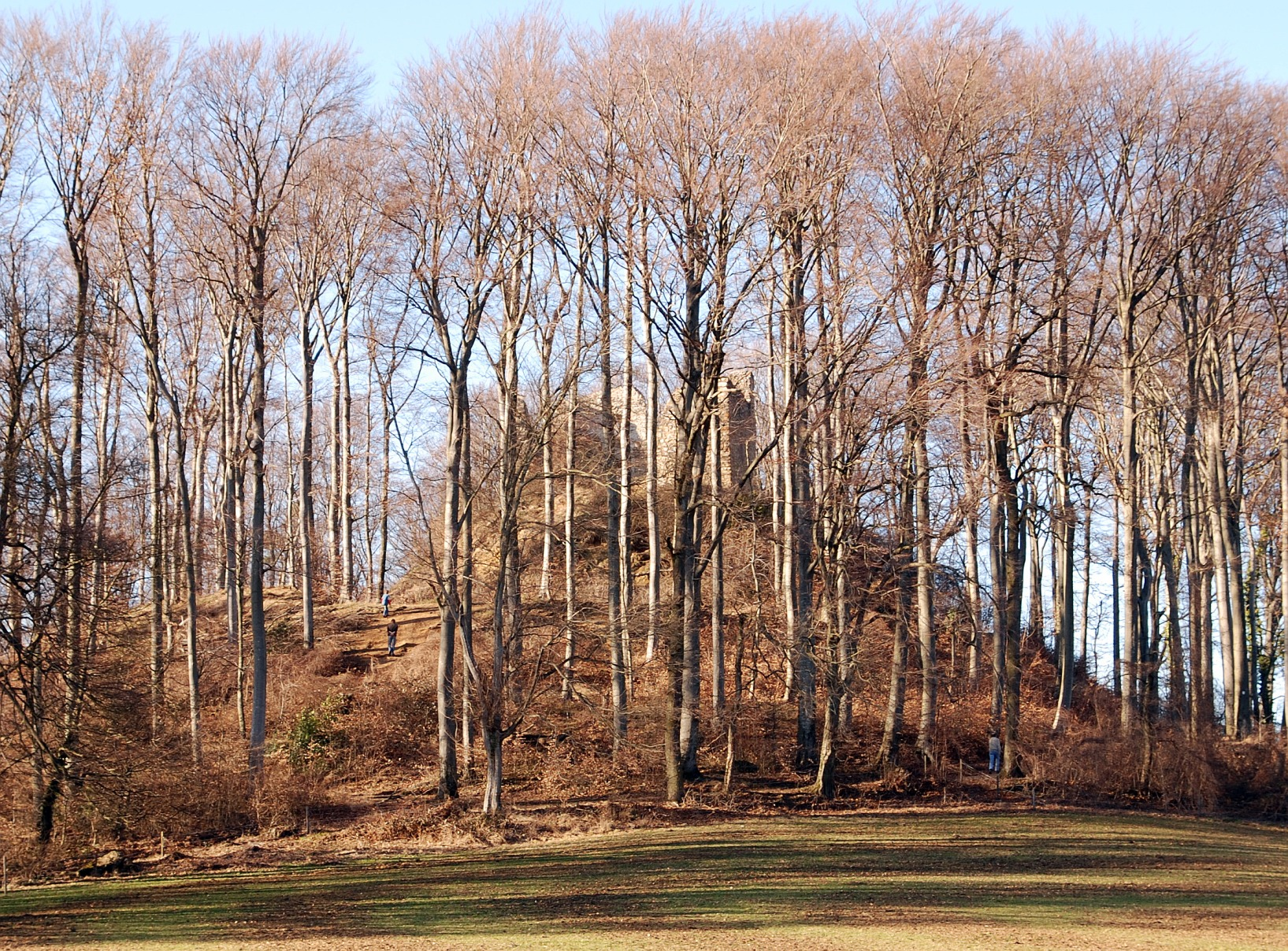
- Schneeburg Ruins

- Location within Baden-Württemberg Schneeburg (Germany)

General information
- Classification: Ruin
- Location: Ebringen
- Coordinates: 47°57′38″N 7°47′53″E
- Completed: before 1312
- Owner: Free Noble

Height
- Height: 516 m above sea level (NN)

Schneeburg is a castle ruin between Ebringen and Freiburg, Germany. The ruins are at an altitude of 516 metres (1693 feet) on the western summit of Schönberg.

== History ==
The castle was first mentioned in 1312 and was built by the Lords of Hornberg. In 1349, Werner von Hornberg handed ownership of the castle over to the Abbey of Saint Gall and became ruler of Ebringen. Schneeburg was most likely abandoned before 1500. It has been claimed that the castle was destroyed in 1525 during the German Peasants' War, but this can not be confirmed.

== Current Conditions ==
All that remains today are part of a tower and living quarters. The Ruin is about 37 metres (121 ft) long and 17 metres (56 ft) wide. On the north side is the rest of the four-storey tower with two windows. The well also remains in good condition in the courtyard.

== Photos ==
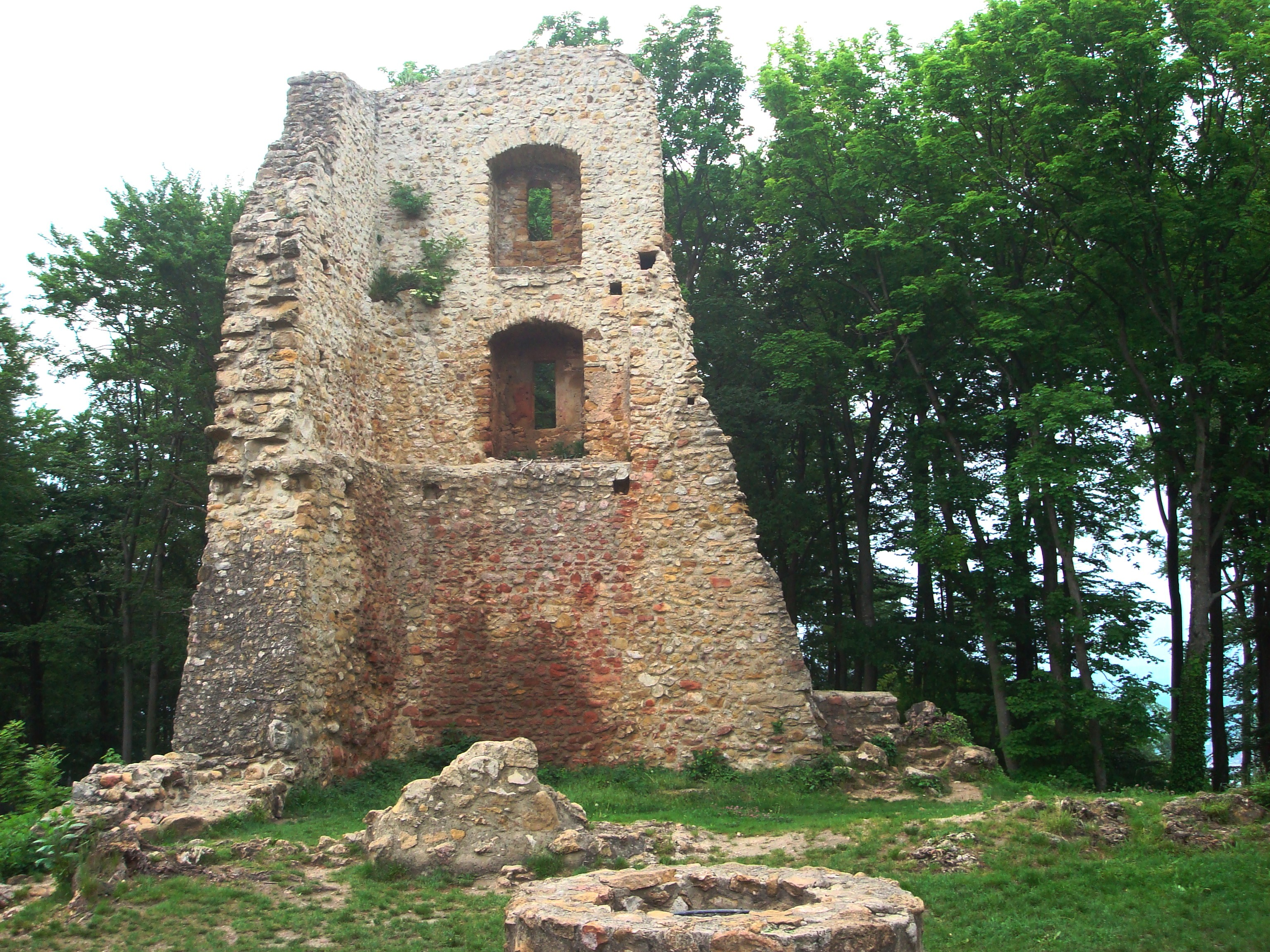
Tower

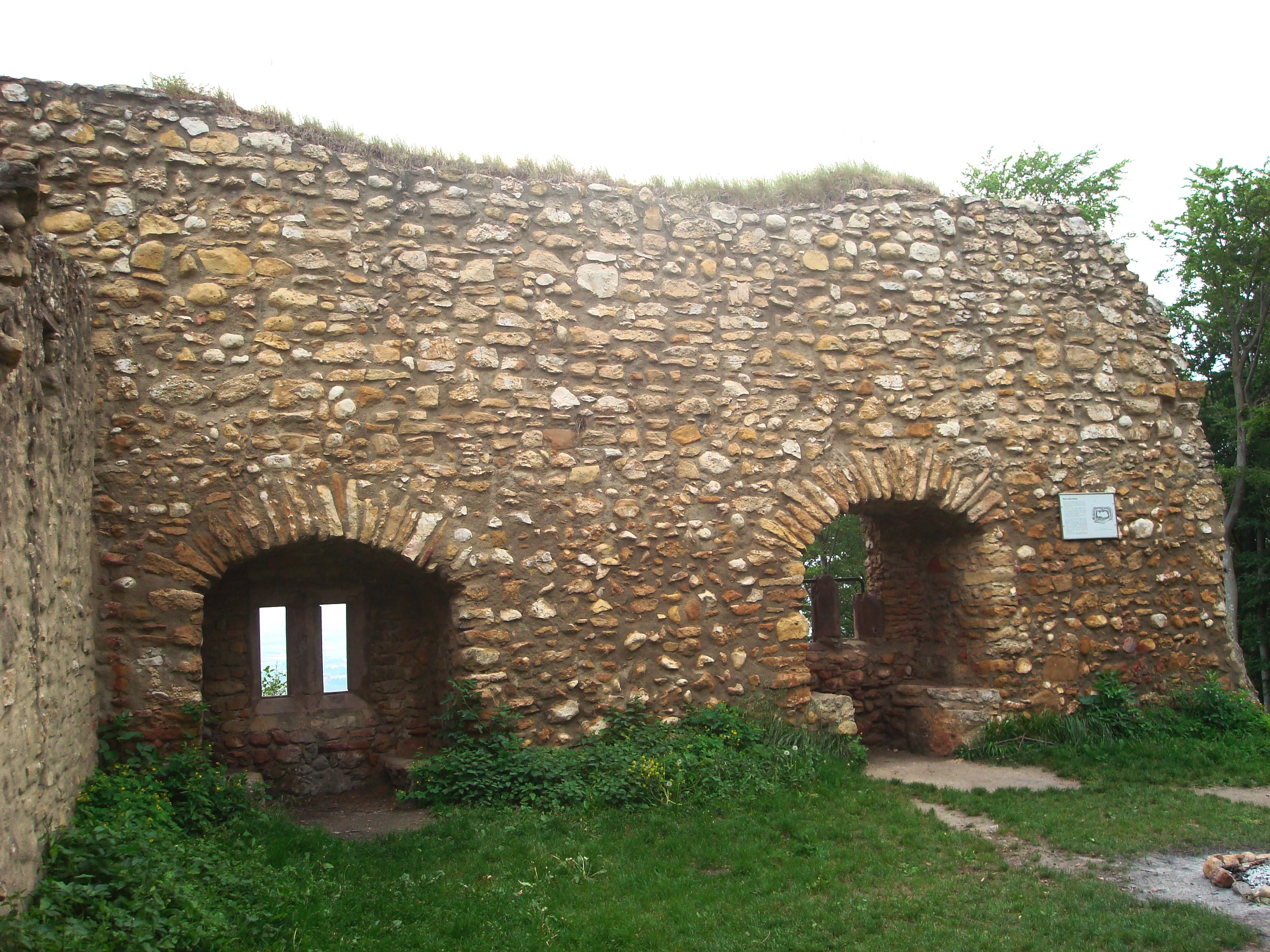
Inner Courtyard

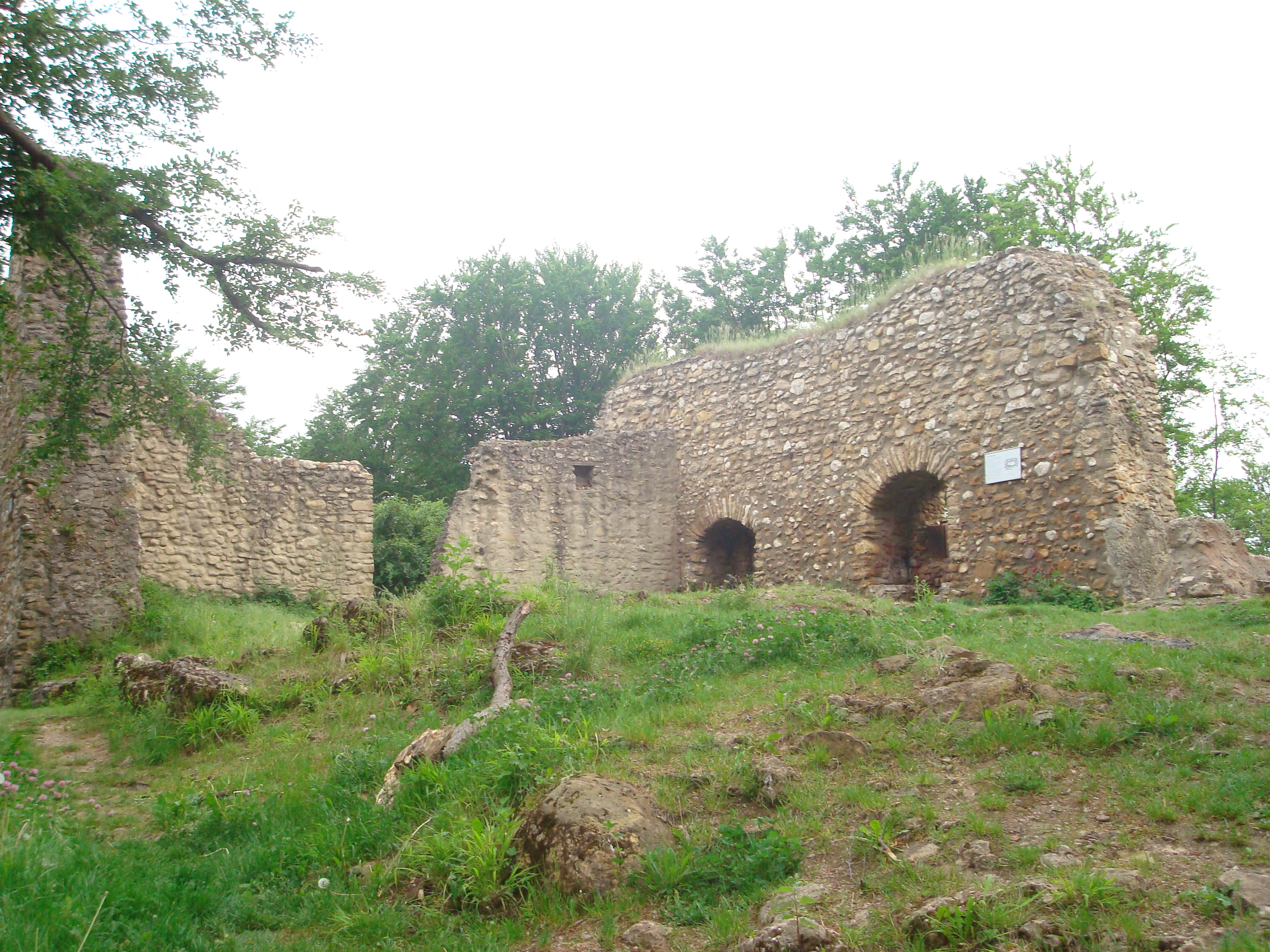
Inner Courtyard, South Side
