= Georg von Wildenstein =

Georg von Wildenstein (died 31 March 1379) was abbot of the Abbey of Saint Gall from 1360 to 1379.

Georg von Wildenstein descended from the House of Fürstenberg and is first documented in the written sources of the Abbey of Saint Gall in the year 1347 as Provost von Ebringen, in 1351 as chamberlain, and since 1357 as working dean. After the death of Abbot Hermann von Bonstetten, the conventuals immediately held an election and elected Georg abbot, although the Roman Curia had, in 1333, explicitly reserved the right of appointment of abbey offices. Only some time afterwards, on 16 October 1360, was Georg confirmed by Pope Innocent VI on the recommendation of Emperor Charles IV.

During Georg von Wildenstein's reign, the strive for independence on the part of the abbey's subordinate estates, namely the cities Saint Gall, Wil and Wangen and the collectives Appenzell and Hundwil, emerged ever more strongly. Thus, the citizenry of Saint Gall denied Georg homage and demanded the concession of further rights regarding the office of mayor, the free election of the council and the admittance of citizens. In 1362, in order to reinforce their demands, the city allied itself with Konstanz, Zürich and other cities around Lake Constance, as well as with the Counts von Werdenberg, while the abbot entered into covenant with the Count of Montfort. Only under the impression of the defeat of a league of Swabian imperial cities against Eberhard II, Count of Württemberg, near Altheim in 1372 did the city and the Abbot of Saint Gall achieve an arrangement, in which the latter enforced his standpoint. Abbot Georg was likewise able to decide the conflicts with Hundwil und Appenzell by means of an agreement in his favour in 1367.

Abbot Georg somewhat succeeded in frightening the household and vested rights of the abbey: in the bequeathed written sources from his reign, only one pawning is pitted against over a dozen releases of pawned properties. Furthermore, he newly purchased the bailiwick over Gossau and Romanshorn.

In 1375, due to illness and old age, Georg appointed, with the conventuals' consent, Kuno von Stoffeln caretaker of the abbey, who after Georg's death in 1379 became his successor in office.

== Reading list ==
- Gössi, Anton: St. Gallen - Äbte: Georg von Wildenstein, 1360-1379. in: Helvetia Sacra. III: Die Orden mit Benediktinerregel. 2/1: Frühe Klöster, die Benediktiner und Benediktinerinnen in der Schweiz. Francke Verlag, Bern 1986, p. 1312-13.
- Duft, Johannes, Anton Gössi and Werner Vogler: Die Abtei St. Gallen. Abriss der Geschichte, Kurzbiographien der Äbte, das stift-sanktgallische Offizialat. St. Gallen 1986, p. 142-43.
