= 1798 Helvetic Republic constitutional referendum =

Constitutional referendum held in the Helvetic Republic over several months in 1798

A constitutional referendum was held in the Helvetic Republic over several months in 1798. Modelled after the French Constitution of the Year III of 1795, the new constitution was approved by voters. In some places voting took places in public assemblies, whilst in others the local councils took the decision.

== Results ==
Area	Date of vote	Method of vote	Decision
Aarau	Start of April	Public assemblies	Approved
Appenzell	22 April	Council	Rejected
Appenzell Ausserrhoden	11 and 18 May	Council	Approved
Appenzell Innerrhoden	6 May	Council	Approved
Baden	1 April	Public assemblies	Approved
Basel	31 March	Public assemblies	Approved
Bellinzona	June	Public assemblies	Approved
Bern	4 April	Public assemblies	Approved
Bernese Oberland	March–April	Public assemblies	Approved
Engelberg	6 May	Council	Approved
Freiburg	24 March	Public assemblies	Approved
Fürstenland	April–May	Public assemblies	Approved
Gaster	31 March	Council	Approved
Glarus	26 April	Council	Approved
Graubünden (except in Chur)	July/August	Public assembly in the High Court	Approved
Léman	15 March	Public assemblies	Approved
Lucerne	30 March	Public assemblies	Approved
Lugano	May–June	Public assemblies	Approved
March	18 April	Council	Rejected
Mendrisio	26 June	Public assemblies	Approved
Nidwalden	13 May	Council	Approved
Obwalden	4 April	Council	Approved
Obwalden	24 April	Council	Revoked
Obwalden	10 May	Council	Approved
Rapperswil (city)	22 April	Council	Approved
Rapperswil (countryside)	22 April	Council	Rejected
Rheintal	8 May	Public assemblies	Approved
Schaffhausen	2 April	Public assemblies	Approved
Schwyz	4 May	Council	Approved
Solothurn	22 March	Public assemblies	Approved
Thurgau	March–April	Public assemblies	Approved
Toggenburg	25 April	Public assemblies	Approved
Uri	17 May	Council	Approved
Uznach	Start of April	Council	Approved
Valais	Start of May	Public assemblies	Approved
Zug	8 May	Council	Approved
Zürich	31 March	Public assemblies	Approved
Source: Direct Democracy
