= Elections in Ebringen =

The following tables shows the results of elections for Kreistag (District Council), Landtag, Bundestag and European Parliament in Ebringen. Over time one can see a slowly shift from a very conservative electorate to a more centrist one.

== District Council (Kreistag) ==
Party	2019	2014	2009	2004
electoral participation	72.3	66.5	67.7	66.4
CDU	26.7	29.8	29.1	45.2
Free Voters	27.2	34.5	34.3	16.6
Green Party	24.2	16.7	16.0	18.9
SPD	6.7	7.5	6.6	12.4
FDP	8.8	8.5	13.9	6.9
AfD	3.3	3.0	-	-
LISB / The Left	3.2	-	-	-

=== Candidates from Ebringen ===
Candidate	2019	2014	2009	2004
electoral participation	72.3	66.5	67.7	66.4
voters with valid votes	1626	1410	1439	1337
maximum votes per candidate	4878	4230	4317	4011
Rainer Mosbach	1633	2342	2497	-
Freie Wähler (Free Voters)	33.5%	55.4%	57.8%	-
Natascha Thoma-Widmann	2050	2100	1808	1760
CDU	42.0%	49.7%	41.9%	43.9%
Klaus Ruh	719	341	441	-
FDP	14.7%	8.1%	10.2%	-
Ralf Schmitt	-	491	561	557
Green Party (Grüne)	-	11.6%	13.0%	13.9%
Georg Albiez	-	-	-	702
SPD	-	-	-	17.5%
Marie-Luise Klees-Wambach	-	-	-	795
Freie Wähler (Free Voters)	-	-	-	19.8%
Hans Benesch	-	-	-	142
FDP	-	-	-	3.5%
Hans Riehle	-	-	53	57
Freie Wähler (Free Voters)	-	-	1,2%	1,4%

== Supraregional Elections ==
European Election (European Parliament)

Party	2019	2014	2009	2004	1999	1994	1989	1984	1979
electoral participation	75.0	65.5	66.9	67.2	44.7	77.1	55.8	46.9	59.4
CDU (Christ-Democratic Union of Germany)	29.7	38.1	36.3	46.2	48.5	34.8	40.8	54.9	58.8
SPD (Socialdemocratic Party of Germany)	11.4	20.3	13.2	16.0	24.4	28.0	27.3	21.3	26.7
Grüne (Green Party)	32.0	20.5	21.1	24.0	17.9	15.6	15.4	14.1	6.7
Die Linke (1999 PDS) (The Left)	3.1	2.8	1.7	1.1	0.8	3.4	-	-	-
FDP (Liberals)	5.2	3.5	14.8	5.8	3.8	12.7	6.5	4.0	5.8
AfD (Alternative for Germany)	6.8	7.6	-	-	-	-	-	-	-
Rep (Republicans)	-	0.3	1.0	0.8	1.7	1.7	6.1	-	-
NPD (National Democratic Party)	0.1	0.2	-	0.3	0.1	-	-	0.5	0.5
Piraten (Pirate Party)	0.3	0.9	1.0	-	-	-	-	-	-
DIE PARTEI (THE PARTY)	2.3	0.5	-	-	-	-	-	-	-
ÖDP (Ecologic Democratic Party)	1.6	0.5	-	0.3	-	-	1.5	-	-
Freie Wähler (Free Voters)	1.4	2.0	-	-	-	-	-	-	-
Tierschutzpartei (Animal Protection Party)	1.6	1.1	-	1.3	-	-	-	-	-
Other (Other Parties)	4.5	1.4	6.8	4.8	2.4	3.8	1.5	4.5	1.5

National Election (German Bundestag)

Party	2021	2017	2013	2009	2005	2002	1998	1994	1990	1987	1983	1980	1976	1972	1969	1965	1961	1957	1953	1949
electoral participation	87.22	87.6	82.6	84.0	86.1	88.2	88.9	84.5	84.5	87.2	90.2	88.1	91.6	92.3	85.7	86.3	82.9	85.0	88.4	73.4
CDU (Christ-Democratic Union of Germany)	23.96	35.7	45.7	36.1	38.6	39.3	37.5	44.9	48.7	48.2	57.2	53.7	61.0	61.0	64.2	65.9	60.5	68.6	76.0	68.3
SPD (Socialdemocratic Party of Germany)	19.92	14.4	18.4	18.5	29.0	29.9	33.9	30.9	32.5	25.9	27.3	35.2	30.7	30.6	27.6	26.3	25.2	19.0	15.6	12.7
Grüne (Green Party)	25.91	19.6	16.4	17.3	17.0	20.7	16.0	12.8	6.4	14.3	9.3	1.9	-	-	-	-	-	-	-	-
Die Linke (before 2005 PDS) (The Left)	3.69	6.6	5.3	4.7	2.5	1.0	0.5	0.4	0.2	-	-	-	-	-	-	-	-	-	-	-
KPD (Communist Party of Germany)	-	-	-	-	-	-	-	-	-	-	-	-	-	-	-	-	-	-	0.4	-
FDP (Liberals)	13.57	10.8	5.1	17.8	10.8	7.3	8.4	7.4	8.6	10.1	5.9	8.7	6.6	7.8	4.9	4.4	9.4	7.3	3.3	8.9
GB/BHE	-	-	-	-	-	-	-	-	-	-	-	-	-	-	-	-	-	2.0	3.0	-
AfD (Alternative for Germany)	4.56	8.7	3.8	-	-	-	-	-	-	-	-	-	-	-	-	-	-	-	-	-
Rep (Republicans)	-	-	0.2	0.5	0.5	0.3	1.7	1.1	1.5	-	-	-	-	-	-	-	-	-	-	-
NPD (National Democratic Party)	0.10	0.1	0.8	0.9	0.5	0.1	0.1	-	0.1	-	-	-	-	-	2.5	1.4	-	-	-	-
Piraten (Pirate Party)	0.15	0.3	2.0	2.5	-	-	-	-	-	-	-	-	-	-	-	-	-	-	-	-
DIE PARTEI (THE PARTY)	1.33	0.6	-	-	-	-	-	-	-	-	-	-	-	-	-	-	-	-	-	-
ÖDP (Ecologic Democratic Party)	0.31	0.5	0.5	0.2	-	0.1	0.1	-	-	-	-	-	-	-	-	-	-	-	-	-
Freie Wähler (Free Voters)	1.69	0.5	0.5	-	-	-	-	-	-	-	-	-	-	-	-	-	-	-	-	-
Tierschutzpartei (Animal Protection Party)	1.43	1.2	0.4	0.6	-	0.5	0.8	-	-	-	-	-	-	-	-	-	-	-	-	-
dieBasis (theBase)	2.36	-	-	-	-	-	-	-	-	-	-	-	-	-	-	-	-	-	-	-
Other (Other Parties)	1.02	?	?	?	1.1	?	?	-	-	1.5	0.3	0.6	1.7	0.6	0.8	1.9	5.0	3.0	1.7	10.1

State Elections (Landtag of Baden-Wuerttemberg)

Party	2021	2016	2011	2006	2001	1996	1992	1988	1984	1980	1976	1972	1968	1964	1960	1956	1952
electoral participation	74.3	79.7	75.9	75.9	61.5	73.5	75.0	76.2	75.7	74.4	82.4	84.3	75,2	73,2	57,1	71,1	68,6
CDU (Christ-Democratic Union of Germany)	26.9	27.3	34.0	46.1	44.5	46.6	41.0	52.2	53.7	59.0	60.5	62.7	59,2	57,0	57,5	67,2	66,8
SPD (Socialdemocratic Party of Germany)	9.4	10.9	21,8	25.2	32.0	22.0	31.9	27.6	30.0	25.2	32.1	30.1	19,1	29,6	22,7	19,6	13,5
Grüne (Green Party)	38.0	38.5	33.6	15.1	14.3	18.0	12.2	11.5	11.5	9.3	-	-	-	-	-	-	-
Die Linke (2006 WASG) (The Left)	3.9	2.6	2.0	2.2	-	-	-	-	-	-	-	-	-	-	-	-	-
KPD (Communist Party of Germany)	-	-	-	-	-	-	-	-	-	-	-	-	-	-	-	0.8	1.1
FDP (Liberals)	7.6	6.9	4.8	8.5	6.4	8.0	4.6	5.3	4.4	6.2	5.9	6.7	13.6	10.4	13.5	11.1	7.0
AfD (Alternative for Germany)	5.4	10.9	-	-	-	-	-	-	-	-	-	-	-	-	-	-	-
Rep (Republicans)	-	0.1	0.5	1.2	2.0	2.8	5.2	-	-	-	-	-	-	-	-	-	-
NPD (National Democratic Party)	-	0.1	0.3	-	-	-	-	-	-	-	-	-	6.7	-	-	-	-
Piraten (Pirate Party)	-	-	1.9	-	-	-	-	-	-	-	-	-	-	-	-	-	-
ÖDP (Ecologic Democratic Party)	0.7	0.5	-	0.3	-	-	-	1.5	-	-	-	-	-	-	-	-	-
Tierschutzpartei (Animal Protection Party)	-	1.2	-	0.9	-	-	-	-	-	-	-	-	-	-	-	-	-
BHE	-	-	-	-	-	-	-	-	-	-	-	-	0.5	1.8	0.7	3.9	
Freie Wähler (Free Voters)	3.0	-	-	-	-	-	-	-	-	-	-	-	-	-	-	-	-
Die PARTEI (The Party)	1.9	-	-	-	-	-	-	-	-	-	-	-	-	-	-	-	-
KlimalisteBW (Climate List)	2.0	-	-	-	-	-	-	-	-	-	-	-	-	-	-	-	-
Other (Other Parties)	1.3	1.0	1.1	0.2	0.8	2.5	-	1.9	0.5	0.2	1.5	0.5	1.3	2.3	4.4	0.7	7.7
