= Schallstadt =

- Municipality
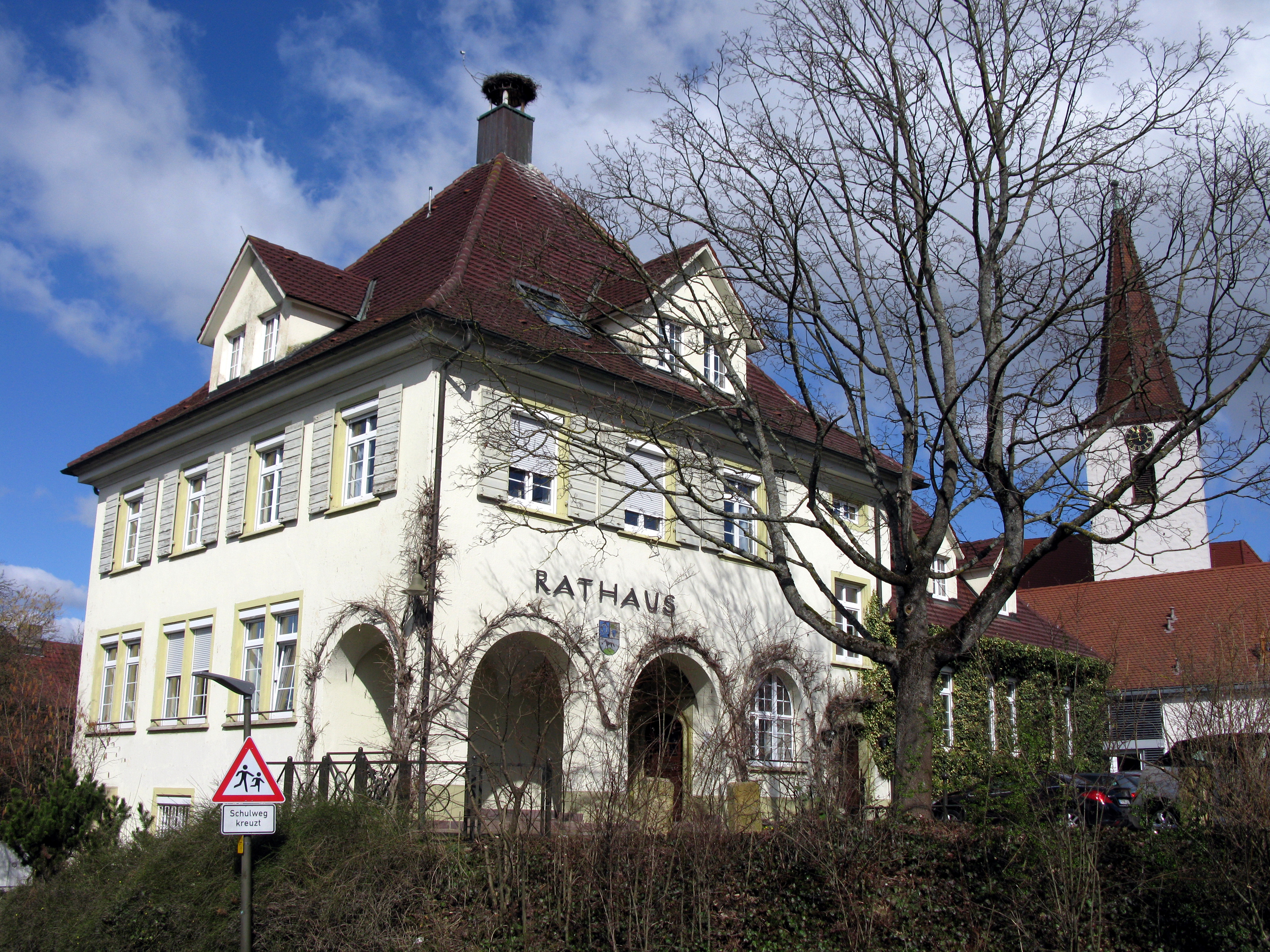
- Town hall

- Coat of arms

- Location of Schallstadt within Breisgau-Hochschwarzwald district
- Interactive map of Schallstadt
- Location within Germany Location within Baden-Württemberg
- Coordinates: 47°57′29″N 7°45′1″E
- Country: Germany
- State: Baden-Württemberg
- Admin. region: Freiburg
- District: Breisgau-Hochschwarzwald
- Subdivisions: 3

Government
  - Mayor (2020–28): Sebastian Kiss

Area
  - Total: 19.56 km^{2} (7.55 sq mi)
- Elevation: 240 m (790 ft)

Population (2025-12-31)
  - Total: 6,966
  - Density: 356.1/km^{2} (922.4/sq mi)
- Time zone: UTC+01:00 (CET)
  - Summer (DST): UTC+02:00 (CEST)
- Postal codes: 79227
- Dialling codes: 07664
- Vehicle registration: FR
- Website: www.schallstadt.de

Schallstadt (German pronunciation: [ˈʃalʃtat]; Low Alemannic: Schallsched) is a town in the district of Breisgau-Hochschwarzwald in Baden-Württemberg in Germany. It is known for its wine production and celebrates an annual wine festival in late summer.

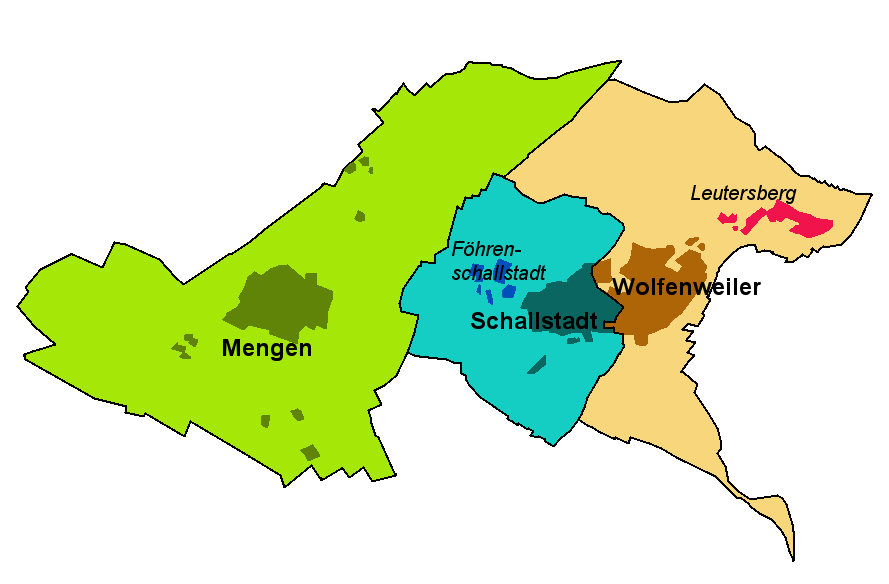
Map of Schallstadt

== Personalities ==
=== Sons and Daughters of the Community ===
- Karl Frey (1886–1987), teacher and businessman, Senator of the South African Union
- Martin Waldseemüller (c. 1470–1520), cartographer, name giver of America

=== Other personalities ===
- Uwe Wassmer (born 1966), former football player
