= Gallus Alt =

St. Gallen prince-abbot (born 1610)

Gallus Jakob Alt (born 10 September 1610 in Oberriet; died 4 March 1687 in St. Gallen) was prince-abbot of Saint Gall from 1654 until 1687.

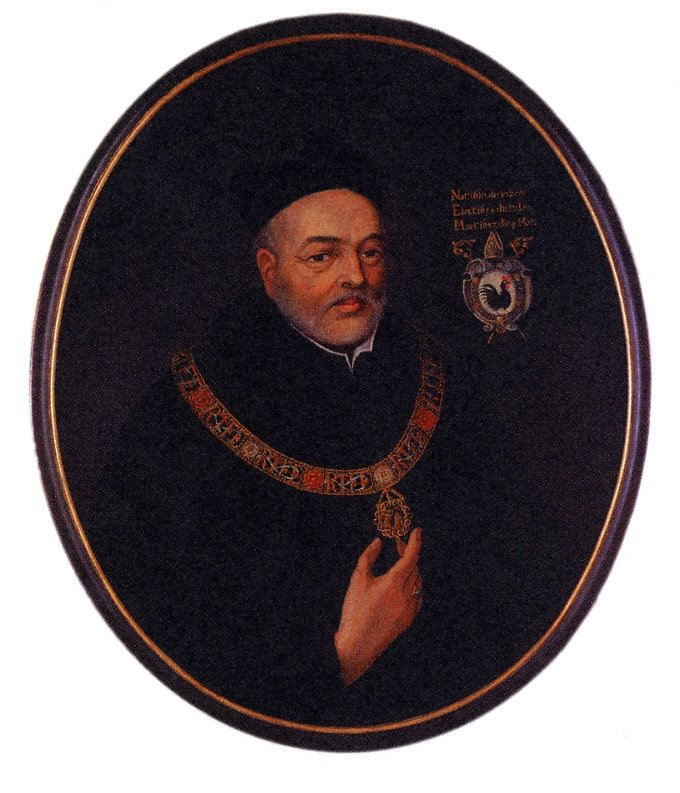
Gallus Alt

== Life ==
Born and raised in Oberriet in the St. Gallen Rhine valley, he received his education in a Latin school in Appenzell. On 8 September 1628, Jakob Alt took his vows in the benedictine Abbey of Saint Gall and was given the monastic name Gallus. He was ordained priest on 16 February 1636. He studied law with Placidus Bridler in Ingolstadt (1639/40) and Rome (1640/42) and graduated with the title of Doctor iuris canonici (doctor of Canonical Law). In Saint Gall, he started to climb the Abbey's administrative hierarchy. In 1645 he was made governor of monastic properties in Ebingen, he became subprior of Saint Gall in 1647, and prior and governor of Neu St. Johann in 1650. In 1652 Gallus was made deacon and thus proxy to his Abbot Pius Reher. After Pius' death on 9 September 1654, Gallus was elected next abbot on 17 December of the same year. He was the second bearer of that name after Saint Gall, the founder of the monastery. He was confirmed in 1655 by Pope Alexander VII, the benediction followed on 7 May 1656.

He was very intent on keeping a strict discipline within the abbey and even succeeded in increasing the number of conventuals from 45 to 70 on average. This increase in members of the monastery prompted him to have additional buildings raised.
