= Fürstenland =

Historic territory of St. Gallen, Switzerland

Fürstenland or Alte Landschaft is the name of a historic territory of the Swiss canton of St. Gallen, corresponding to the modern districts of St. Gallen (without the city proper), Wil and Rorschach. It was a subject territory of the Abbey of St. Gallen until 1798. Its population, known as the Gotteshausleute, came into conflict with the Abbey after the Swiss Reformation, during 1525–1531. After the defeat of Zürich in the Second War of Kappel, the Fürstenland was forced to return to Catholicism. After the French Revolution, the territory was granted increased autonomy in a treaty of 1795, and in 1797 additionally its own seal and the right to elect a local parliament. On 14 February 1798, it constituted itself as a "Free Republic" (Freie Republik der Landschaft St. Gallen), which was absorbed into the Canton of Säntis three months later.
