= Mentona Moser =

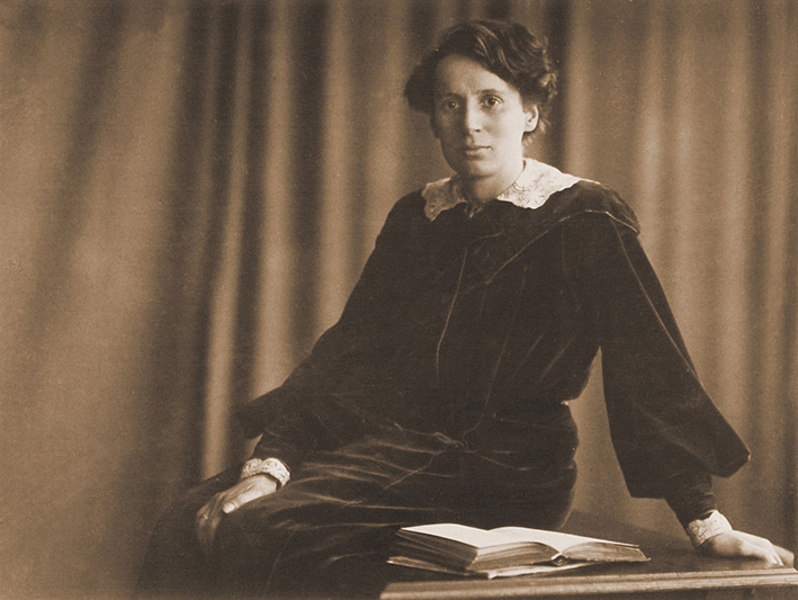
- Born: Luise Moser; 19 October 1874; Badenweiler, Grand Duchy of Baden, German Empire
- Died: 10 April 1971 (aged 96); Berlin, East Germany
- Occupations: social worker, writer, communist functionary
- Years active: 1899–1933

Mentona Moser (19 October 1874 – 10 April 1971) was a Swiss social worker, communist functionary and writer. Born into wealth, she disapproved of high society, and became involved in philanthropic work, helping to launch the Swiss Communist Party and one of the first birth control clinics in Zürich.

In Berlin, she opposed fascism, and her large inheritance was confiscated when Hitler rose to power. In 1950, she was made an honorary citizen of the German Democratic Republic as a reward for her dedication to communism. She received both the Clara Zetkin Medal and the Patriotic Order of Merit by East Germany. Moser is recognized as one of the founders of social work in Switzerland.

== Early life ==
Luise Moser, as she was baptized, was born on 19 October 1874 in Badenweiler of the German Empire to the Baroness Fanny Louise von Sulzer-Wart of Winterthur, Switzerland and Swiss watchmaker and industrialist Heinrich Moser from Schaffhausen. Though named after Mentone, a municipality along the Franco-Italian border, where her parents had happily spent some time, the Lutheran clergyman who baptized her refused to register her name as Mentona. Her maternal grandfather, Baron Heinrich von Sulzer-Wart, had inherited his title from her great-grandfather, Johann Heinrich von Sulzer-Wart, who had been awarded a peerage for service to Maximilian I Joseph of Bavaria. When her parents married, in 1870, their union created scandal because Fanny was 23 and Heinrich 65, though both were from the upper echelons of society. Her father had made a fortune creating an inexpensive watch of good quality for sale in the Russian market before opening a second successful factory in Switzerland. He had five children by his first wife, who had died twenty years before his remarriage. The elder children did not accept Fanny and, when Heinrich died four days after Moser was born, Moser's mother was accused of killing him. Fanny became the wealthiest woman in Eastern Europe and, though two autopsies showed no foul play in the death, suspicion continued. She had a mental breakdown, and was one of the five women included in Freud's Studies on Hysteria, which launched his career.

After Heinrich's death in 1887, Fanny bought a large chateau near Au and entertained lavishly, putting the care of her children in the hands of a nursemaid. The mother-daughter relationship was strained, as Moser felt that her mother had a negative attitude towards her and preferred her older sister Fanny. She lived in an imaginary world in which her father became the object of near hero-worship. As was typical for people in her class, she was taught both French and English by governesses. During 1888 and 1889 the family traveled through various spa towns like Badenweiler, Karlsruhe, Vienna and Wiesbaden, while the castle was being renovated and her mother was being treated by Freud. They also wintered at places like Abbazia on the coasts of the Adriatic Sea, but Moser found the frivolous lifestyle tedious and became convinced her mother's problems were caused by her lack of social service.

In 1891, Moser began the study of zoology at the University of Zürich, but a dispute with her mother after a trip to Algiers led Fanny to send Moser to a boarding school in Wimbledon, London. Moser relished the freedom and continued her zoology studies, but also began courses in botany and English literature. Struck by the conditions of the poor in Southwark, she became involved in the settlement movement and learned of a two-year course being offered to teach social work at the Women's Colleges of the University of Cambridge. She enrolled in 1899 and completed the course while working in a settlement house, also spending time in workhouses and lecturing as an assistant in evening courses offered to the residents. In 1901, she returned briefly to Switzerland. During one trip to Rome with her mother, she met Eleonora Duse and her partner, Gabriele D'Annunzio. Returning to London, she went to work in a cottage hospital acting as nurse, but found the work overtaxing. By 1903, she decided to return to Switzerland.

== Establishing social work in Switzerland ==
That same year, Moser's sister Fanny married with Jaroslav Hoppe and she felt her presence at Au was barely tolerated. Moser moved into a student apartment in Zürich and began giving lectures on public welfare. She also began publishing, with such works as Contributions to the Charity and Social Assistance in Their Practical Application Feminine Youth of the Upper Classes: Considerations and Recommendations. Founding an association for the blind, she arranged chauffeurs, pamphlets and helpers and then also founded the first social welfare office to assist tubercular patients. By 1904, she had moved into an apartment with Dr. Clara Willdenow and her friend, Pauline Bindschedler, at Kreuzstrasse 44. She and Willdenow became lovers, and, in Moser's later biography, she described their relationship as "lesbian love", a phrase not in common use at the time. Soon she submitted design plans to the city council for laborer settlements in Zürich, which led to the construction of such settlements near St. Jacob's Church and in Zürichberg.

In 1907, Moser developed plans based on the English model for women's courses in social welfare. These would later be adopted and developed into the School for Social Work. By 1908, Moser was giving lectures on childcare. The following year her Blind Association was adjoined to the state programs developed to provide general care for the blind, which included workshops and a library for the blind developed by Moser. She also designed playgrounds, working with the city construction manager, Dr. Hermann Balsiger. She joined the Socialist Party, traveling to party meetings in other countries to study worker cooperatives. At one such meeting in Davos, Moser began developing a relationship with Balsinger, which eventually led to her breakup with Willdenow. In January 1909, Moser and Balsinger married and she gave birth to the couple's first child, a daughter they named Amrey, on 24 December of the same year. Two years later, in 1911, she gave birth to their son, Edouard. In 1913, Moser's son became seriously ill with tuberculosis of the spine, causing the couple stress, but her husband, who had successfully planned a food cooperative, was deemed essential to the country and was spared war service.

Though initially enamored of her grandchildren, Moser's mother soon lost interest. As part of her estate was lost in a relationship with a much younger man, she cut off the daughters' stipends from the inheritance, convinced she was a pauper. War austerity and the need to take Edouard for treatments in various spas began to keep the couple physically apart. Simultaneously, they grew philosophically distant as he took up a judgeship and she moved farther left toward Communism. They divorced in 1917 and Moser returned to using her maiden name. She sued Balsinger for support to pay for Edouard's medical care, but lost the case as no lawyer was willing to argue against a judge. To earn income, Moser took a job at Pro Juventute managing maternal and infant care for the next five years. In 1921, she joined with others in forming the Communist Party of Switzerland and began speaking and writing about communist activities. She became an advocate for women's suffrage and opened a clinic for contraception in Zürich, which was revolutionary at the time. Though she became head of the communist women's group, after Rosa Bloch-Bollag died, Moser's authoritative manner brought conflict and her political radicalism put her job at Pro Juventute at risk. In 1924, Moser left Zürich for Berlin.

== Life abroad ==
Moser moved to Berlin to enroll her daughter, Amrey, in ballet classes. In 1925, her mother died, and she and her sister Fanny inherited their father's somewhat-reduced but substantial estate. Moser traveled to Italy, and was struck by the changes that fascism had brought to the country she had loved. In 1926, accepting a position as a writer for the Swiss Communist Party newspaper, she took Edouard with her and moved to Moscow, reporting on hospitals, worker cooperatives and conferences. She also made a trip to the factory her father had once owned. Returning to Switzerland the following year, she made plans to have an international children's home built in Moscow and relocate permanently to Berlin. Gathering medical supplies and materials, with the help of Fritz Platten, she planned to have the children's home located in the suburb of Waskino (Vas'kino). By May, 1929 Moser had settled in Berlin and traveled back and forth to Moscow to check on the construction of the children's home, which was completed in October.

In Berlin, Moser began working for the record company of the Roter Frontkämpferbund (Red Front Fighters), investing large sums of money in the distribution of pro-communist records. She used her contacts to secure participation by such artists as the singer Ernst Busch, the composer Hanns Eisler, and the poet Erich Weinert. As the Nazis rose to power, in 1932, the record company was banned and demonstrations escalated. Moser began to be surveilled regularly. Finding it impossible to distribute communist literature, she began working for Red Help to assist with political prisoners. In 1933, when Hitler came to power, what remained of her inheritance was seized and she was under threat of arrest. Mentona escaped to France and, after a few years of engaging in anti-fascist resistance in Paris, she returned to Switzerland in 1935.

== Later life ==
Moser was virtually penniless and began writing, publishing numerous articles in the communist newspaper Basler Vorwärts. She also began writing her autobiography. In 1941, she published an illustrated children's book, Learn to Know Them, which featured birds and common animals. It was well-received and was reprinted several years later in Berlin. She remained in Switzerland during World War II, while Edouard spent the war years in England. At the end of the war, he returned to Switzerland on the promise from the mayor of Schaffhausen that he could help him find work, but ultimately, no work was secured because of Edouard's poor health. In 1950, when Wilhelm Pieck, an old friend of Moser's, became the first president of East Germany (GDR), he offered to make her an honorary citizen of the GDR and award her a pension. She accepted the offer and returned to Berlin.

In 1956, she and her children's families held a reunion at Neuhausen am Rheinfall. The following year, she returned to the USSR to visit the children's home, which had been relocated to the town of Ivanovo. In 1957, Otto Grotewohl, first prime minister of the GDR, awarded Moser the Clara Zetkin Medal and, in 1959, she was honored with the Patriotic Order of Merit. She remained active, though with increasing problems with deafness and arthritis, until her son Edouard's death in 1966.

== Death and legacy ==
Moser died on 10 April 1971 in East Berlin, and was buried in the Baumschulweg Cemetery. She is recognised as one of the founders of social work in Switzerland.
