= Erwin Sumser =

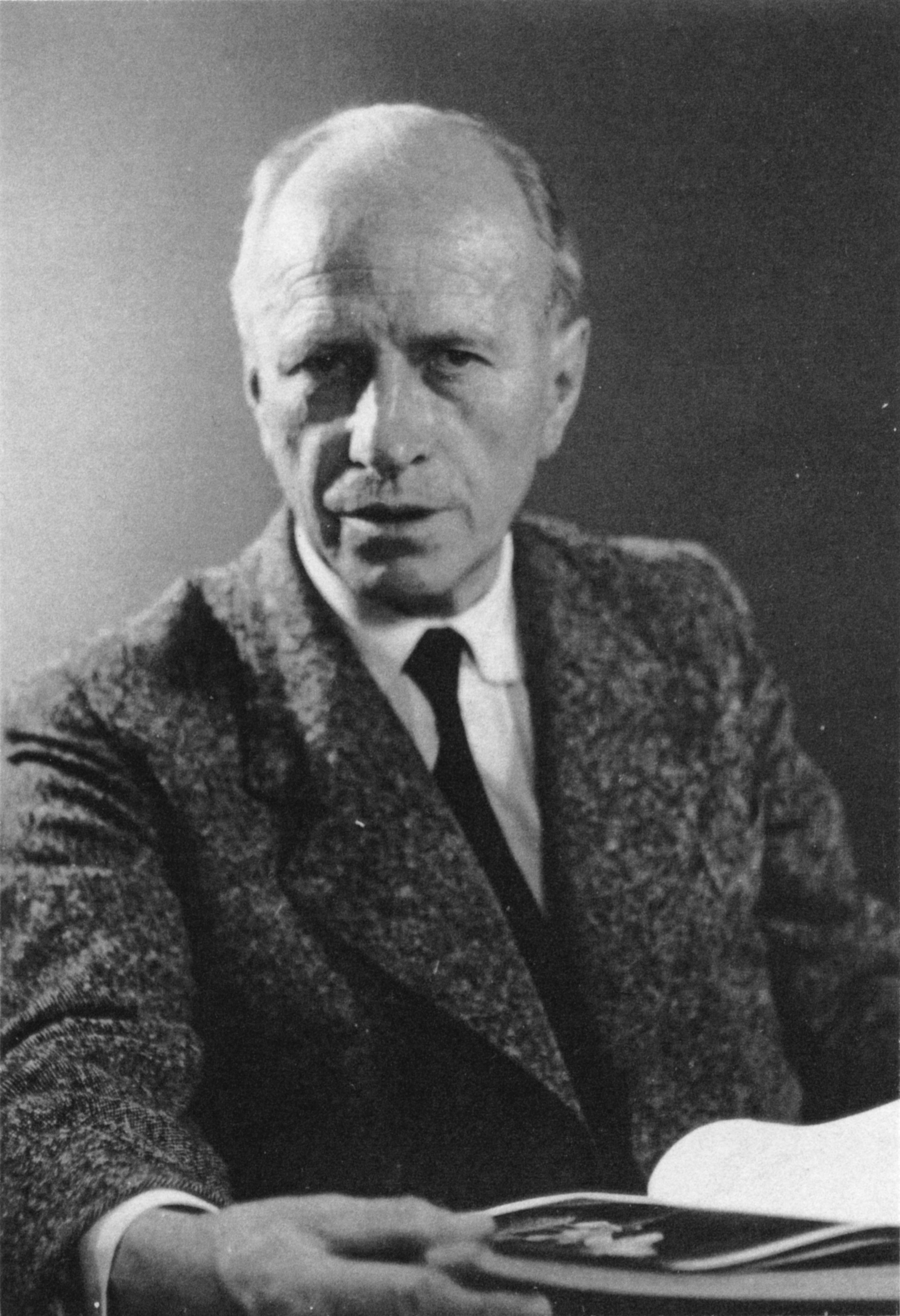
Erwin Sumser, 1950

Erwin Sumser (8 October 1891 – 22 January 1961) was a German physician. He was born and grew up in Merzhausen where he came to know the Schönberg and to appreciate the multitude of orchids growing there. In 1931 he purchased several floristically valuable lots of land in the Jennetal which came to be called Sumser's Garden (German: Sumsergarten). Later he also bought comparable lots of land on the Baar. In 1960 he sold all his private nature reserves to the federal state of Baden-Württemberg.

== Bibliography ==
Kuhn, Benno, Weshalb das Naturschutzgebiet Jennetal auch Sumsergarten genannt wird (why the nature reserve Jennetal is also called Sumser's garden), in: Ebringer Dorfgeschichten, volume 1, pp. 1-8, Ebringen 2008

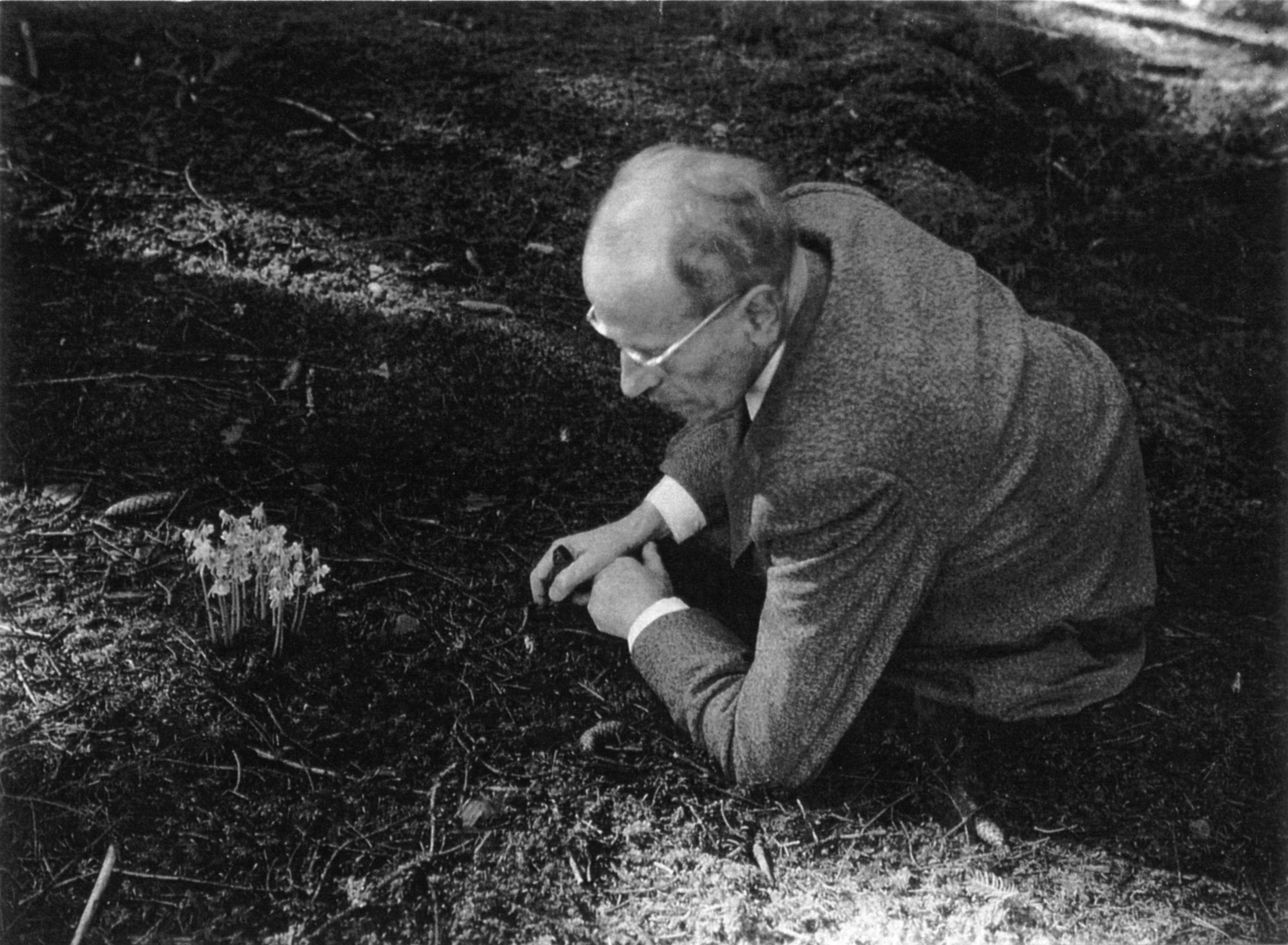
Erwin Sumser in the Baar, looking at a ghost orchid
