= Heinrich Moser =

Heinrich Moser may refer to:

- Heinrich Moser (watchmaker)
- Heinrich Moser (artist)
