= Fanny Moser =

Fanny Moser may refer to:

- Fanny Moser (baroness) (1848–1925), Swiss baroness considered the richest woman in Eastern Europe
- Fanny Moser (scientist) (1872–1953), Swiss-German zoologist
