= Fanny Moser (baroness) =

Swiss noblewoman

- Other names: Emmy von N.
- Born: Fanny Louise von Sulzer-Wart; 29 July 1848
- Died: 2 April 1925 (aged 76)

Fanny Moser (29 July 1848 – 2 April 1925), born Baroness Fanny Louise von Sulzer-Wart, also known as Emmy von N., was a Swiss noblewoman who at one point was one of the richest women in Europe. She was one of the five women evaluated in Freud's Studies on Hysteria, which led to his psychoanalytic theories. She is credited with helping Sigmund Freud discover one of the corner stones of psychoanalytic technique, free association.

== Biography ==
Fanny Moser was born on 29 July 1848 in Winterthur, Switzerland. Her father, Baron Heinrich von Sulzer-Wart had inherited his title from her grandfather, Johann Heinrich von Sulzer-Wart, who had been awarded a peerage for service to Maximilian I Joseph of Bavaria. On 28 December 1870, she married Swiss watchmaker and industrialist Heinrich Moser, who had made a fortune by developing high-quality watches to sell on the Russian market. H. Moser & Co. then expanded to include a factory in Switzerland and Heinrich founded a railway company in Schaffhausen, furthering his wealth.

The marriage caused scandal because Fanny was 23 and Heinrich 65, though both were from the upper echelons of society. The five older children from her husband's first marriage were fully grown, as their father had waited twenty years before his remarriage, but they rejected Moser. She had two children with Heinrich: Fanny, born 27 May 1872 and Luise, the author Mentona, born 19 October 1874, just four days before her father's death. The older children accused Moser of killing her husband and despite no evidence of foul play determined by two autopsies, suspicion continued. Moser had a mental breakdown and began seeing therapists in 1889.

One of these was Sigmund Freud (not yet famous) who wrote her case into his seminal work Studies on Hysteria under the pseudonym Fau Emmy Von N. In this case history, Freud tells us that she urged him "not to keep on asking her where this and that came from," and instead "to step out of the way to let her tell [him] what she had to say". Freud took her advice and saw that allowing her thoughts to emerge freely like this would be the method of unearthing unconscious material which would supersede his early use of hypnosis. This was the beginning of what came to be called "free association", a central concept in psychoanalysis.

She acquired a castle, Schloss Au, where she entertained lavishly, but was known for her eccentricities, continuing treatment for almost a decade. Late in life, she became infatuated with a much younger man, lost part of her fortune and cut off relationships with her daughters.

She died on 2 April 1925 in Zürich. When she died, she left millions to her daughters, though she had been convinced she was living in poverty. Moser was buried at the cemetery of Kilchberg, Zürich.
