= Interdom =

Boarding school for foreigners in Ivanovo, Russia

Coordinates: 57.031°N 40.9896°E

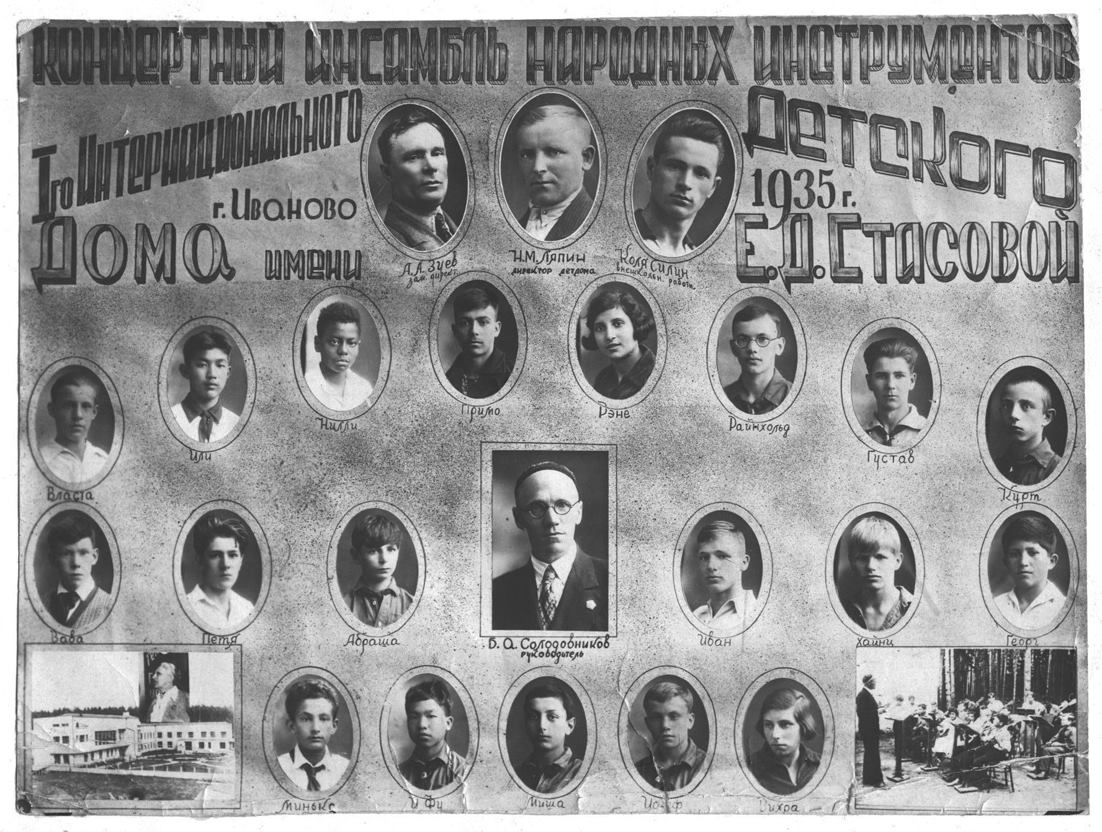
Interdom

Interdom (Ivanovo International Boarding School) is a special school for foreigners located in the city of Ivanovo in Russia. The name is an abbreviation of the Russian internatzionalny dom or "International House".

== History ==
The idea for the school of this type was put forth by a Swiss activist, Mentona Moser, and she donated part of her inheritance towards the school. Initially it was set near Podolsk in the village of Vaskino, and it was finished in 1929 but in 1933 a new building was constructed, financed by the textile women of Ivanovo under the patronage of the Soviet section of International Red Aid (also known as МОPR, its Russian acronym). The new building was designed in the constructivist style, floorplanned as the hammer and sickle. The boarding school was later named after founder Elena Dmitrievna Stasova. It was conceived as a school for children of repressed democratic leaders and activists from all over the world.

About 5,000 children from 85 countries attended the school. Interdom also became home for many children victims of the World War II Siege of Leningrad and of the 1986 Chernobyl disaster.

At the beginning of the 21st century plans to transform the international school into a military academy for cadets (Suvorov Military School) were successfully blocked after the children staged a hunger strike and wrote a letter to President Vladimir Putin. It lost its "international" status, but the association of the graduates successfully appealed to restore it and now the official name of the school is «Международная школа «Интердом» имени Е.Д. Стасовой» under the aegis of the federal state enterprise "Центр международного сотрудничества Министерства просвещения Российской Федерации"

== Bibliography ==
- Balsiger, Roger Nicholas (2005). "Lebensgeschichte von Mentona Moser" [Life story of Mentona Moser] (PDF). Stadtarchiv Schaffhausen (in German). Schaffhausen, Switzerland. Archived from the original (PDF) on 22 February 2014.
