= Jennetal =

Coordinates: 47.9623°N 7.7884°E

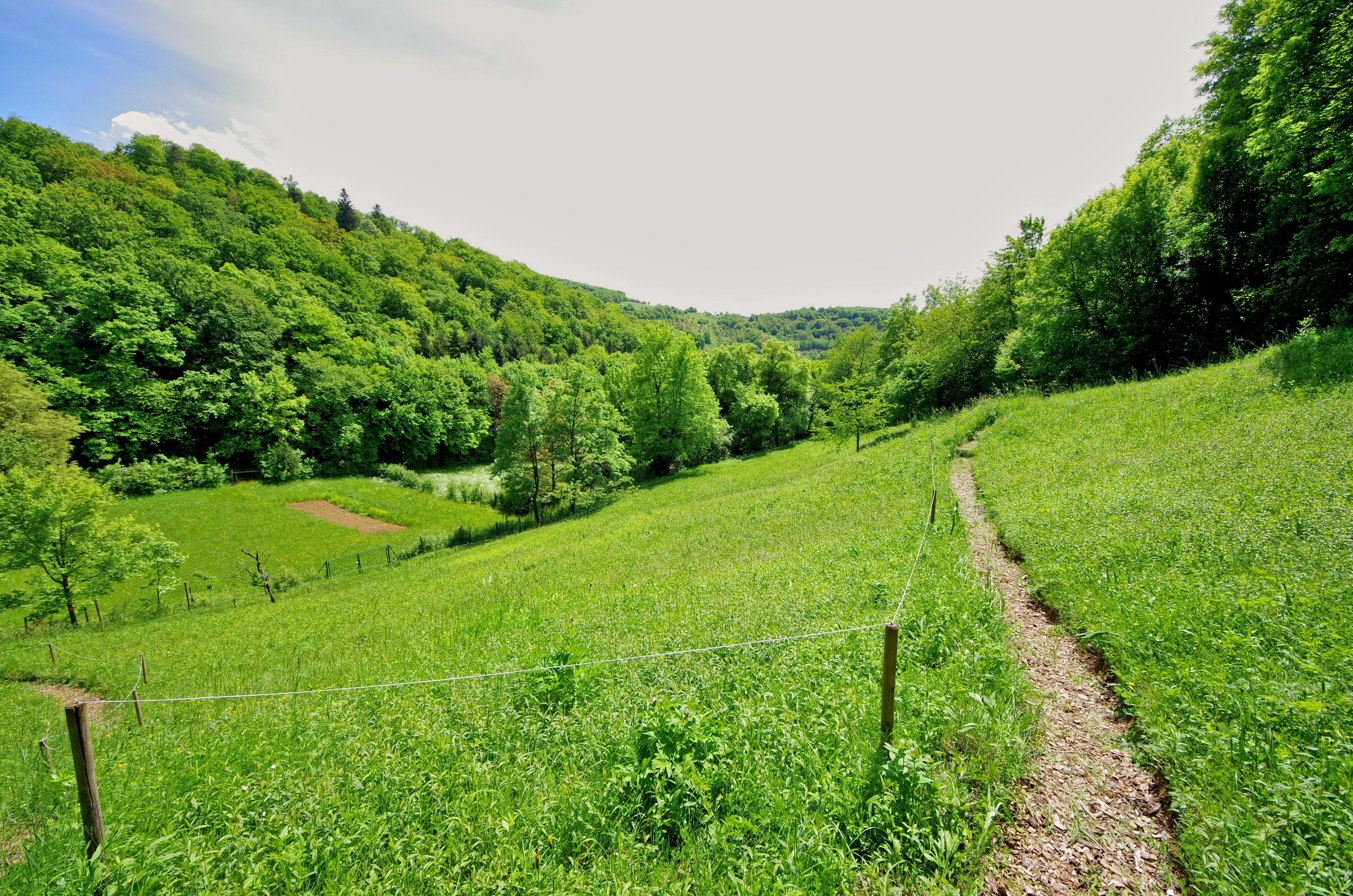
Sumser's Garden in the Jennetal

The Jennetal (the suffix -tal means dale) is a valley cut in the Schönberg mountain and also the name of a nature reserve, where it's located.

== Location ==
The Jennetal is located on the southwestern slope of the Schönberg, directly above Ebringen, at an altitude of about 1,100-1,475 ft (340-450 m) above sea level.

== History ==
=== Sumser's Garden ===
In 1931 Erwin Sumser purchased several lots of land in the Jennetal which he himself converted into a nature reserve. Upon his initiative, this nature reserve of originally 0,7095 ha became an officially protected area in 1937. In 1960 he sold this area, which is commonly called Sumser's Garden (German: Sumsergarten), along with his other private nature reserves on the Baar, to the federal state of Baden-Württemberg.

=== Extension of the area ===
In 1996 the nature reserve Jennetal was extended to nearly 23 ha.

== Flora ==
=== Trees ===
Among others: common hornbeam, sessile oak, downy oak, hawberry, chequer tree, service tree

=== Plants ===
Outstanding species: orchids, himantoglossums
