= Schönberg (Ebringen) =

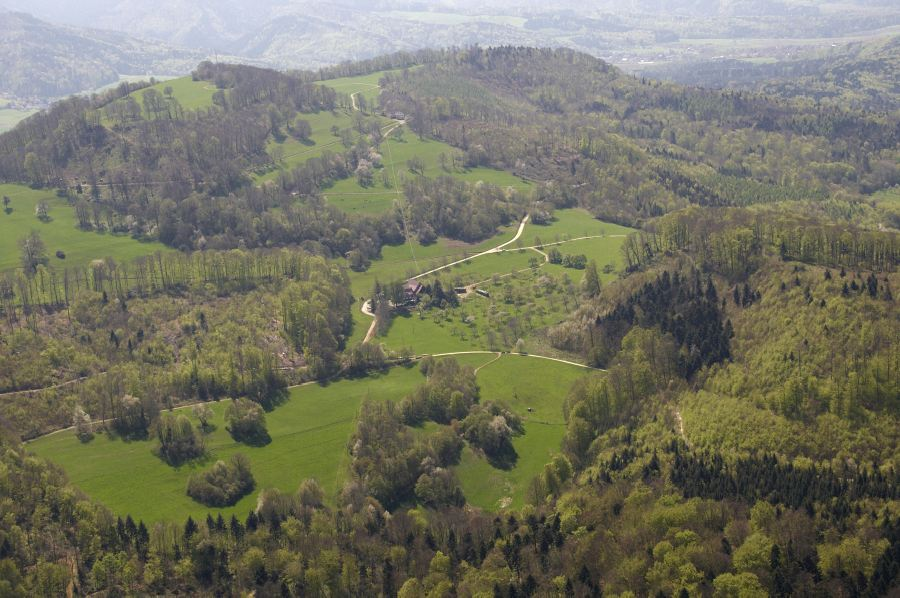
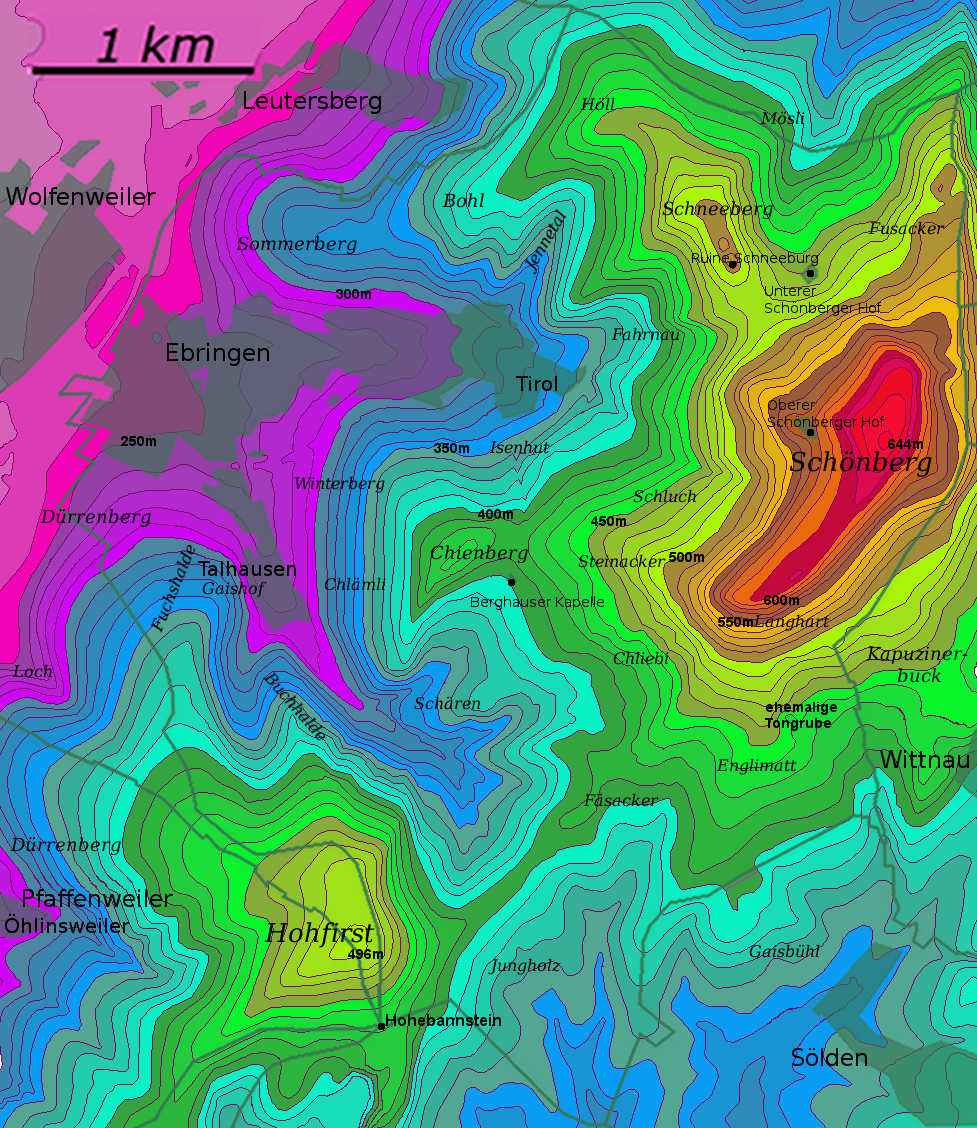
- Aerial view of Schoenberg, looking from the north Contour map of the Schönberg, 10m-gaps

Highest point
- Elevation: 645 m (2,116 ft)
- Coordinates: 47°57′17″N 7°48′20″E

Geography
- Location within Baden-Württemberg
- Location: Baden-Württemberg, Germany

The Schönberg (German pronunciation: [ˈʃøːnbɛʁk]; earlier known as Schirnberg) is located on the southern outskirts of Freiburg im Breisgau and at 644.9 meters above sea level the Hausberg (a prominent mountain) of the municipality of Ebringen.

== Municipality ==
The mountain belongs to Ebringen but the slopes also form part of the districts of Schallstadt, Merzhausen, Au, Wittnau, Sölden, and Sankt Georgen (a suburb of Freiburg).

== Geology ==
Together with the Black Forest and the Rhine plain, the Schönberg forms the third prominent area of land around Freiburg, the foothills of the Black Forest. To the east, the Schönberg is separated from the Black Forest by a valley called the Hexental, to the south by the Staufen Basin, to the north the Bay of Freiburg (Freiburger Bucht) and to the west lies the Rhine Plain . The area thus enclosed is 8 km long and 4 km wide.

Together with the Hohfirst (493.6 meters) in the south and the Ölberg (416.4 meters), which is the southernmost spur, the mountain forms the Schönbergmassiv (Schönberg massif), a promontory of the Black Forest, which itself is part of the Upper Rhine Plain. Due to geological disturbance and rift valleys the surface provides evidence from all periods of the Mesozoic era, as well as signs of volcanic activity of the Tertiary era.

This includes a small tuff vent on the southern slope close to the chapel of Berghausen and a bigger vent on the northern slope close to the restaurant Schönberger Hof. Along the southeast slope, to the west of the former clay pit is a 100 m-long (330 ft) basalt Lode.

The lower areas on the western slope are covered by thick layers of loess. The eastern slope of the Schönberg falls steeply towards a valley called the Hexental. At the foot of the eastern slope, the Kapuzinerbuck (a mountain named after the Friars Minor Capuchin) is evidence of major landslides.

== Mining ==
Trying to achieve autarky, the Third Reich intensified iron ore mining in 1935 which is why the deeper layers of the mountain are well explored today. In close proximity to the town center of Ebringen, two derricks had been erected, which were operating all day. Water from the local creek served as drilling fluid.

Most of the mining took place in two different areas:The northern pit, located in Sankt Georgen (a district of Freiburg) and a southern pit in the Ebringen district, from which smaller amount of ore was extracted. Ore from the southern pit was transported via cableway to the loading station in Sankt Georgen. In addition, a smaller mining field existed close to Bollschweiler (Kuckucksbad). Here, mining was shut down in 1939 however, because the iron ore contained only 20-30 % of iron and was therefore not worth mining. In 1942 mining was already ceased, because, in addition to the low iron content, the course of war led to an increased availability of iron ore from France (Lorraine) and Sweden.The main reason for the cessation, however, might have been caused by the intensified use of the Paschke-Peetz-Method (a method used in steel production) for the metallurgy of acid iron ore. This method made the supply of calcareous ore from the Schönberg unnecessary.

== Etymology ==
Between 1700 and 1900 the standard German name of the mountain - "Schönberg" - progressively replaced the Allemann or Middle High German name "Schirnberg" or "Schimberg" for official purposes. Schönberg is an etymological wrong transcription of the dialect variant.

The word "schin" either derives from the Middle High German word "schin = "shine, visible from a distance" (engl. shine) or from the Middle High German scina/schine relating to the flattened shape. It has nothing to do with the word "schön" = "pretty".

== Settlement ==
It can be assumed that people started visiting the Schönberg 160,000 years ago. Two sites at Bollschweil and Ehrenstetten are 100,000 years old. Bones of mammoths, wild cattle and woolly rhinoceros were found here. Evidence of hand axes and spearheads indicates that permanent settlement of the Schönberg began at that time.

The main neolithic settlement was located on top of the mountain, where there is now a radio tower of the SWR, a regional public broadcasting cooperation from the southwest of Germany. This 58-meter-high (190 ft) steel lattice mast, built in 2012, was erected next to an old transmission tower, that has now been demolished. Other prominent sights are the upper Schönberger Hof, a farm on the southern slope of the mountain, and the lower Schönberger Hof, a restaurant with a view of the city of Freiburg. The old castle ruin of Schneeburg is located on a western subsummit of the Schönberg.

The Jesuit castle at Merzhausen (northern district of Freiburg) is also worth visiting.

== Historical background ==
On the third of August 1644 the western slope of the Schönberg was the site of the first day of the Battle of Freiburg, that took place during the Thirty Years' War. Fighting between Bavarian and French troops continued on the 5 and 9 August on the Lorettoberg, directly opposite the eastern slope of the Schönberg. France's main goal was to regain control over the city of Freiburg, which the allied troops of Saxe-Weimar had lost on 27 July to Bavarian troops after several weeks of siege. The French managed to conquer the district of Bohl on the western slopes of the Schönberg, although with heavy losses. The Bavarian troops retreated over the Schönberg into fortified positions on the Lorettoberg and were thus able to successfully hold the mountain and the city of Freiburg against the French enemy.

France sustained heavy losses during the Battle of Freiburg: 1100 soldiers died conquering the district of Bohl, whereas Bavaria only lost 300 men. During the battle the suburbs of Freiburg were destroyed and the villages around the Schönberg were sacked and thereby severely damaged.

A memorial cross on the Schönberg above Leutenberg and Ebringen commemorates the battle of Freiburg on 3 August 1644. The cross replaced the ossuary, where the bones of the fallen soldiers were buried thirty years after the battle. The mass grave became a place of pilgrimage, much to the displeasure of the church. Bones were often stolen as they were venerated as relics. The church could not prevent further pilgrimages so Ildefons of Arx ordered the remaining bones to be taken away in 1791, which meant the end of the pilgrimages over the next few decades.

== Flora ==
=== Forest ===
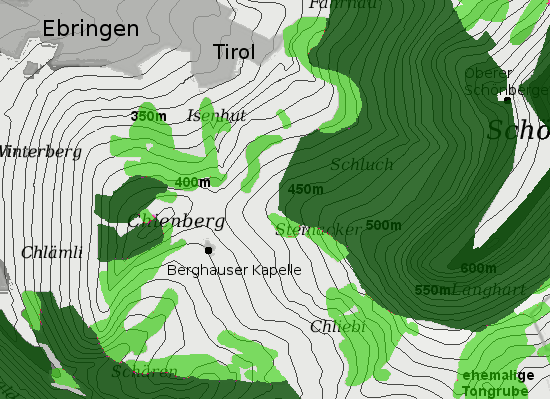
Different stages of forestation on the Schönberg in the 20th century. Dark green: Forest around 1900; light green: Increase of forests until 2000. Scale: 2km to 1.5km.

The higher mountain slopes of the Schönberg are not suitable for farming, but they are used either for silviculture or grazing. 9.4 km^{2} of the Schönberg massif (which is in total 24 km²) and 3.4 km² of the actual mountain are covered with forest. The dominant tree of this mixed deciduous forest is the common beech, but due to the many different types of soil and the local climate there are many different forest communities, as well as monocultures.

Mainly beeches and silver firs grow in the deep and damp soil and form a dense canopy . For this reason, low shrubbery is almost entirely absent and only shade tolerant plants like enchanter's-nightshade, arum and woodruff grow there. The major part of the forest stands on dry and nutrient-poor soil. Durmast oak, field maple and whitebeam, as well as the non-local conifer scots pine are to be found here. In addition, pinnate coralroot, dog's mercury, as well as carex and various orchids, for example bird's-nest orchid and red and white helleborine grow here. Oak and hornbeam forests grow in some places. Ash-alder communities dominate the headwater regions.

It can be assumed that in earlier centuries, when the forests were used as grazing lands, the woodland edge was less prominent than it is today. Evidence of this is the striking frequency of the holly tree, that was not cleared and thus spread rapidly. Since the mid-twentieth century the forest has been on the advance and it requires regular care to prevent a forestation of the edge of the meadows. A diploma thesis found that in the early 18th century, the local people cultivated the soil of the upper and lower plateaus, although these plateaus were forest regions at that time.

=== Viticulture ===
Vineyards are grown on the western and southern slopes and sporadically even on the southeast slopes. In these altitudes a number of short-living plant species, so-called annual plants, dominate. They are able to produce three to four generations per year and thus survive even frequent weed control as an entire species. Amongst the most well known species are the cickweed, dead-nettles and birdeye speedway. Furthermore, bulb plants, also called geophytes, grow between the vines. Firmly rooted in the ground they survive the intense cultivation of the vineyard. They are largely of Mediterranean origin. Special mention should be made of the very common grape hyacinth and wild garlic, from which this community of herbs derives its name. Less frequent are the hairy star of Bethlehem and the local wild tulip. Since the end of the seventies the flora has been pushed back by lawn thatch, which is frequently used for mulching.

== Valleys ==
- Jennetal
