= Agnes Bluhm =

German physician, eugenicist (1862–1943)

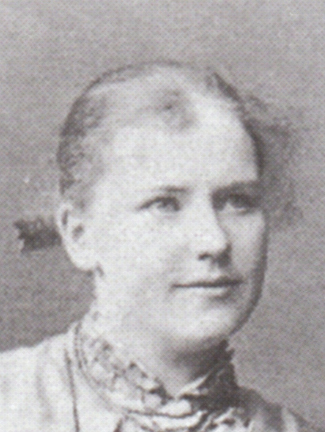
- Bluhm in 1886
- Born: 9 January 1862; Constantinople, Ottoman Empire
- Died: 12 November 1943 (aged 81); Beelitz, Nazi Germany
- Citizenship: German
- Known for: Eugenics

Agnes Bluhm (9 January 1862 – 12 November 1943) was a German physician, eugenicist, and winner of a Goethe medal. She believed that German women could improve the race using eugenics and forced sterilisation. She wrote that the "female psyche" made her gender predisposed towards working for "racial hygiene".

== Life ==
Bluhm was born in Constantinople in 1862. She was trained as a medical doctor and won prizes for her research. She believed that German women could improve the race using eugenics. While a student, she met Friedrich Nietzsche and became part of the students in his circle, which included Eva Corell, Meta von Salis, Resa von Schirnhofer and Clara Willdenow.

In 1886 she fell in love with Alfred Ploetz who was already involved with another scientist named Pauline Rüdin. They became involved whilst conducting dissection and they decided to get married early in 1887. Ploetz was also seeing an American named Mary Sherwood who was studying hypnotism. Ploetz returned to Rüdin in 1888 and married her. Bluhm however kept Ploetz as a close friend throughout her life and they both shared similar views on racial purity and the benefits of eugenics.

Bluhm became the third female doctor in Berlin and she joined two fellow Zurich trained doctors to staff a clinic for poor women there in 1890. She joined the Racial Hygiene Society in 1906.

Bluhm had to retire from practising medicine due to problems with her ears but she redirected her efforts to medical research. After 1918 she conducted extensive research on heredity in animals to try to determine how a race could be improved. She is said to be first German female doctor known for her research. She carried out research on alcoholism and heredity under early funding from the Rockefeller Foundation. Bluhm was awarded in 1931 a Silver Leibnitz Medal for her work.

In 1936 she published her book which laid out her views on the role of women. The Racial Hygiene Problem for Women Physicians described how she saw women's role to work hard at reproduction in order to improve humanity. She strongly advocated against smoking, noting research which showed lower fertility in women who smoked. Women should look to motherhood and not to emancipation as their contribution. Although Bluhm had a career she saw this as a special case because of the need for speciality doctors. In general she thought that women should not have careers. Moreover, she recommended that the "female psyche" made her gender predisposed towards working for "racial hygiene".

She won the Goethe-Medaille für Kunst und Wissenschaft during the war. Adolf Hitler awarded about 400 of these medals during his time in power but only five were awarded to women and the rest were a singer, actresses and writers.

Bluhm died in Beelitz, Germany, in 1943, aged 81.
