= Clara Willdenow =

German physician and gynaecologist (1856-1931)

- Born: 8 October 1856; Bonn, Kingdom of Prussia
- Died: 7 April 1931 (aged 74); Zürich, Switzerland
- Education: University of Zurich

Clara Willdenow (8 October 1856 – 7 April 1931) was a German physician. She was one of the first German women to attain a medical degree, though because she was denied study in her own country, she earned her degree in Switzerland. Opening a private gynaecology clinic, she operated it for more than two decades. Willdenow was openly lesbian and did not attempt to hide her orientation.

== Biography ==
Clara Willdenow was born on 8 October 1856 in Bonn, Kingdom of Prussia. Her father, Karl Willdenow is sometimes styled as a pedagogist from Berlin, at others as a privy councilor from Breslau and at others a curator at the University of Bonn. Her great-grandfather was the botanist Carl Ludwig Willdenow.

Willdenow was privately educated until completing her Abitur and then enrolled in 1884 at the medical school at University of Zurich. At the time, German universities refused to admit women. Studying in Zürich until 1887, after passing her Propaedeutic Examinations she went on to further her education at Bern, with a specialty in paediatrics. While she was still a student, she met Friedrich Nietzsche and belonged to his circle, which included Agnes Bluhm, Eva Corell, Meta von Salis, and Resa von Schirnhofer. She was awarded a degree in 1893, becoming one of the few German women granted a medical degree before 1900.

Willdenow conducted laboratory work under Edmund Drechsel, the noted chemist. She studied the milk protein casein and conducted research into the inorganic salts of lysine in the 1890s. In 1894, she opened a private gynaecological practice in the Seefield district of Zürich, which she operated until 1923. She was known for her explicit relationships with women and was likely exclusively lesbian. Between 1904 and 1909, she was the lover of Mentona Moser and then for thirty-one years had a relationship with Pauline Bindschedler. The word lesbian was not in common use at the time, but in describing their relationship, Moser specifically called it "lesbian love".

In 1900, Willdenow and other doctors signed a petition asking the Federal Council to accept examination results for Swiss universities as prerequisites for the German examinations. Though in 1899, German law changed and allowed women to participate in the medical profession, the application of the law was varied among the German states. Willdenow later volunteered as a doctor in a Berlin clinic. She died on 7 April 1931 in Zürich.
