= Merzhausen =

- Municipality
- Coat of arms

- Location of Merzhausen within Breisgau-Hochschwarzwald district
- Interactive map of Merzhausen
- Location within Germany Location within Baden-Württemberg
- Coordinates: 47°57′59″N 07°49′43″E
- Country: Germany
- State: Baden-Württemberg
- Admin. region: Freiburg
- District: Breisgau-Hochschwarzwald

Government
  - Mayor (2024–32): Melanie Kienle (CDU)

Area
  - Total: 2.76 km^{2} (1.07 sq mi)
- Elevation: 281 m (922 ft)

Population (2025-12-31)
  - Total: 5,381
  - Density: 1,950/km^{2} (5,050/sq mi)
- Time zone: UTC+01:00 (CET)
  - Summer (DST): UTC+02:00 (CEST)
- Postal codes: 79249
- Dialling codes: 0761
- Vehicle registration: FR
- Website: www.merzhausen.de

Merzhausen is a town in the district of Breisgau-Hochschwarzwald in Baden-Württemberg in Germany.

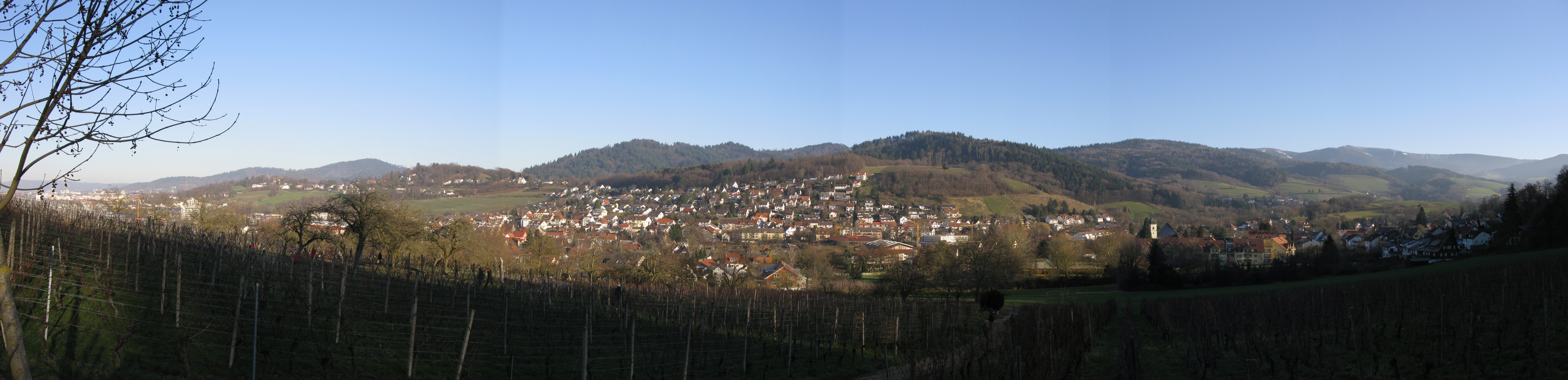
Merzhausen with Freiburg (left) and Schauinsland (right)

== Geography ==
=== Location ===
The northern and eastern part of Merzhausen is attached to the town of Freiburg im Breisgau. To the south, Merzhausen borders the municipality of Au, which belongs to the administrative region of Hexental and to the west, the municipality of Ebringen.

Merzhausen is the smallest municipality in the local area with the highest population density, which is also higher than that of Freiburg.

=== Landscape ===
Between Schönberg and the Black Forest, lying at the northernmost part of Hexental, Merzhausen belongs to both the so-called foothill area as well as the Black Forest, which the main fault passes through the municipality between Oberrheingraben and the Black Forest. The municipality is located at a height of 254 to 538m.

=== Municipality ===
The municipality is made up of the village of Merzhausen and the castle Jesuitenschloss.

== History ==
Merzhausen was first recorded in 786, when the original land owner Heimo Güter gave it away to the Abbey of Saint Gall. After diverse noble families of Freiburg occupied the land, the Society of Jesus of Freiburg acquired it. After the abolition of the holy order in 1773, the land passed over to the Schnewlin family of Bernlapp and after them, in 1838, the land became the Schauenburg. Eventually, the land pass over to the newly created Grand Duchy of Baden, alongside all of Breisgau.

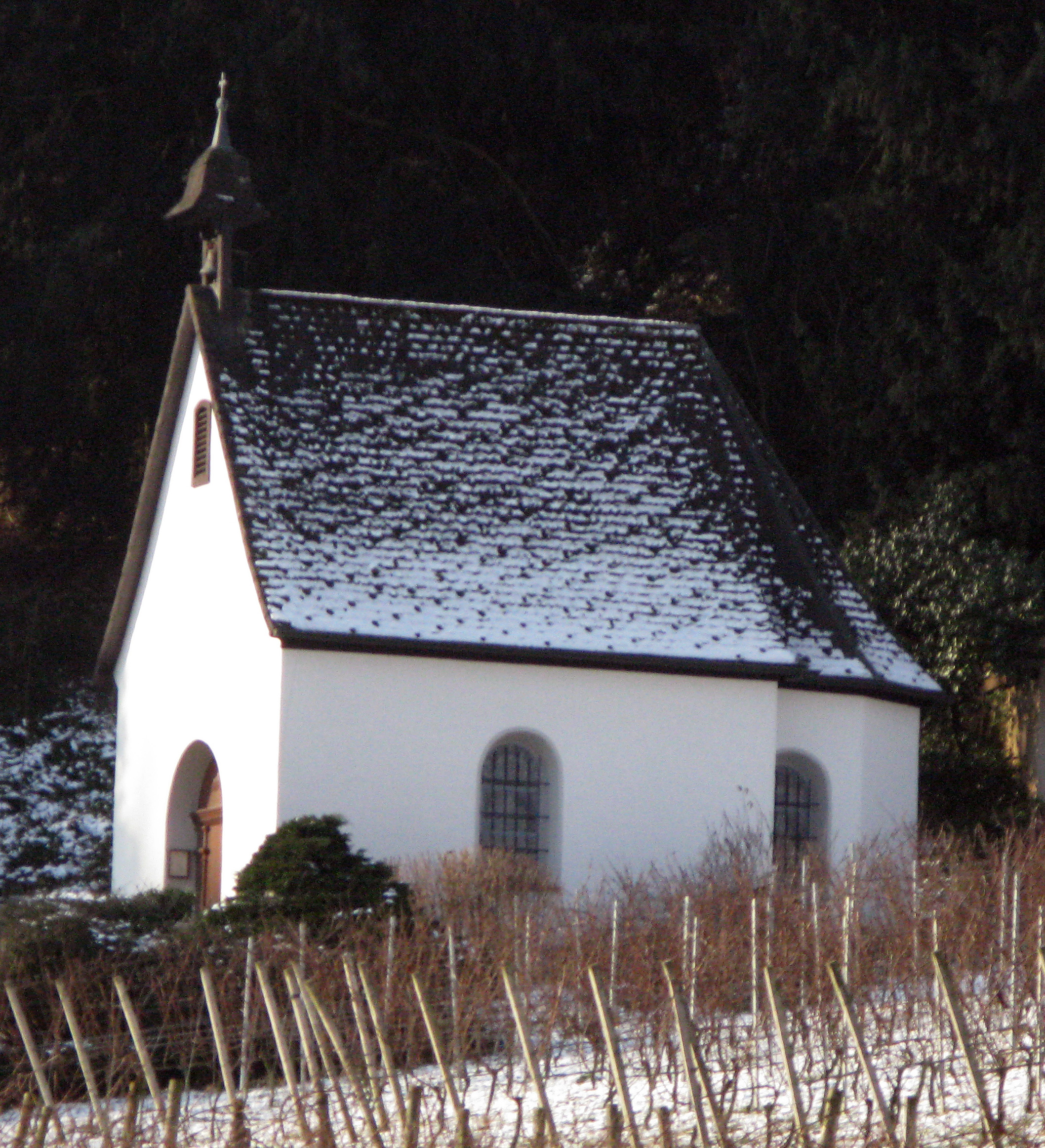
Schönstatt Chapel

== Demographics ==
Population development:

| Year | Inhabitants |
|---|---|
| 1990 | 4,340 |
| 2001 | 4,569 |
| 2011 | 4,822 |
| 2021 | 5,284 |

== Religions ==
Merzhausen stayed after the reformation Roman Catholic. The parish church is dedicated to Saint Gall. The parish community belongs to the pastoral unit of Hexental.

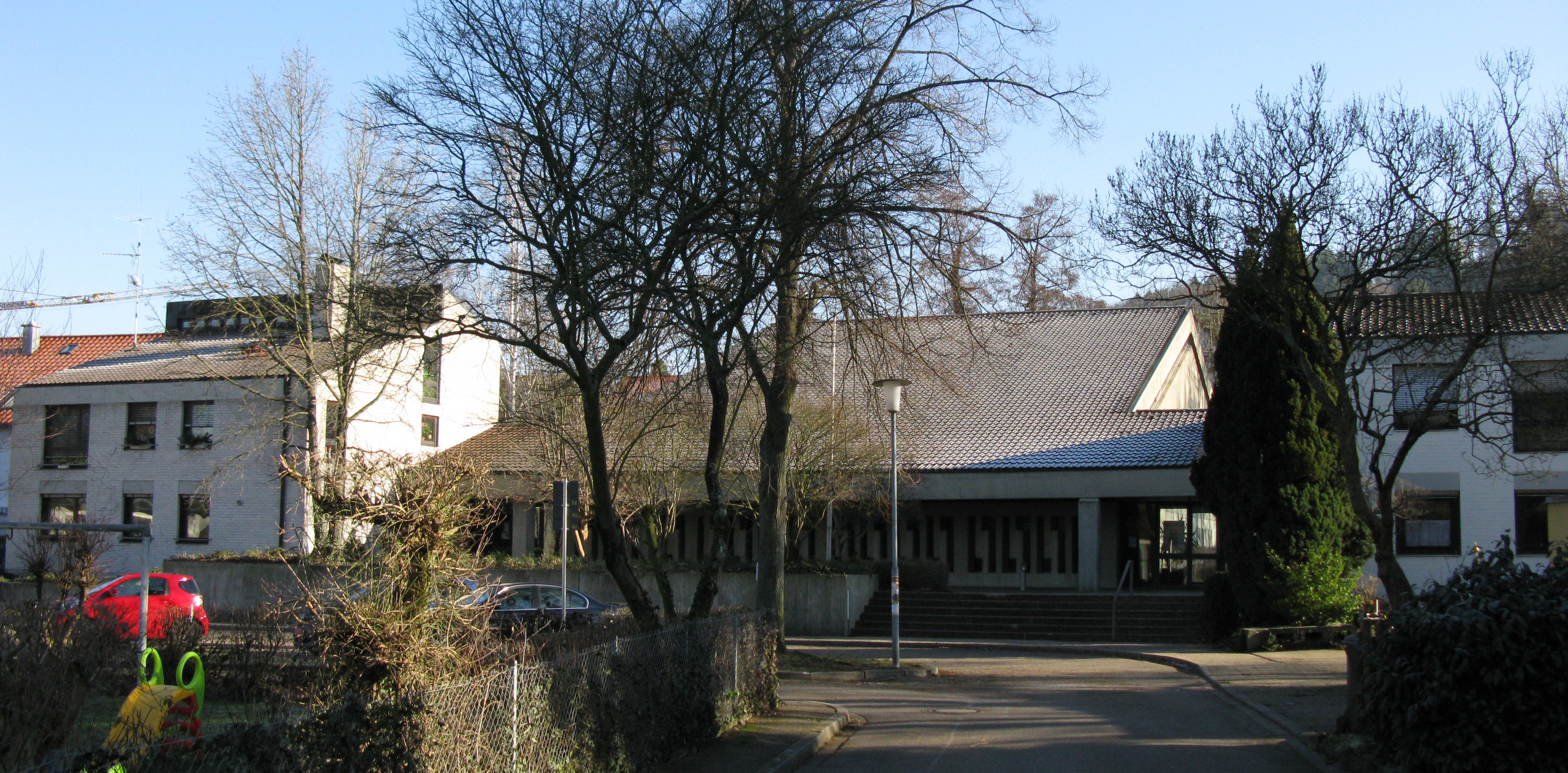
John's Evangelical Church

Because of the immigration of the people who were driven from their homes after the Second World War, an Evangelical community arose, called the Johannes-Gemeinde, John's community.

Between 1980 and 1981, the Schoenstatt Movement was created at the northern slope of the Schönberg.

== Politics ==
=== Local council ===
The local elections, which took place on 25 May 2014, resulted in the following seat distribution. The turnout was 50.9%, down from 2009 (55.62%).

| Die Grüne | 48.5% | +14.4 | 7 Seats | +2 |
| CDU | 28.9% | -1.1 | 4 Seats | =0 |
| FBG | 22.6% | +1.1 | 3 Seats | =0 |

=== Mayor ===
In March 2024, Melanie Kienle was elected mayor of Merzhausen.

=== Coat of Arms ===
Merzhausen's coat of arms depicts on a silver (white) background a black bear, the symbol for being part of the St Gallen cloister, which holds in front of itself the crest of the Schnewlin family. The crest is horizontally divided into a gold part and a green part.

=== Partner Towns ===
Merzhausen has been partnered with Dardilly in the département of Rhone in France since 1982.

== Economy and Infrastructure ==
=== Economy ===
Untied purchasing power per inhabitant was €20,871 in 2005. There are only 40 other communes in Baden-Württemberg, that have a higher purchasing power. Except for a discount supermarket to the north and a full-range provider to the south, Merzhausen also possesses several smaller retail stores on Hexentalstraße and in the middle of Merzhausen. Every Saturday, there is a weekly market which is located in the Marktplatz in front of the Forum Merzhausen and is open from 8am-1pm.

Six gastronomical companies, three of which have guestrooms, offer their services next to four vineyards, which grow the following wine varieties, Müller-Thurgau, Chasselas, pinot noir, pinot gris and pinot blanc as well as Riesling.

Elsewhere, predominantly small and medium-sized companies in the area of trade, crafting and servicing as well as freelance professions within Merzhausen.

=== Authorities ===
Until 2005, Merzhausen had its own police force. This was dissolved which meant that the next police station in Ehrenkirchen is the only one in the local area.

=== Media ===
Hexental publishes the Hexentäler Amtsblatt fortnightly, which is delivered to all households free-of-charge. Additionally, a free information brochure is released every two years about the municipality of Hexental in the A + K publishing house.

=== Public institutions ===
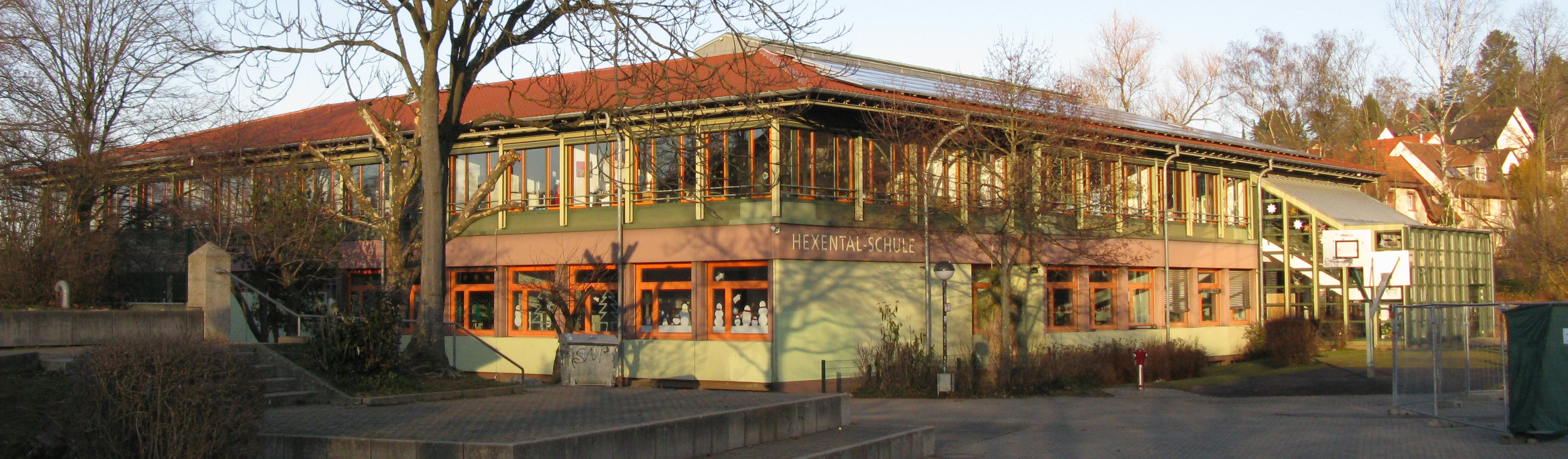
Alois Rapp House at the Hexentalschule

Alongside different kindergartens and nurseries, Merzhausen possesses a primary school (Hexentalschule) and different private schools. There is one Catholic public bookstore and two retirement homes.

The school's building, which until 2011 also contained a secondary school, was located on private grounds. In recognition of his donation, the municipality named the building after Alois Rapp in 2011. The rooms of the secondary school, which became available, were obtained by local associations.

Additionally, there is also a post office and a recycling centre in the town.

Merzhausen is one of the few municipalities that does not possess its own fire service. Instead Freiburg's fire service has taken over the job of keeping Merzhausen fire-free. Citizens of Merzhausen are allowed to help as volunteer firefighters in the Unterstadt division of the Freiburg fire service.

=== Further institutions ===
Merzhausen is the headquarters for the Zentrale für Unterrichtsmedien im Internet (The centre for instructional media on the internet)

=== Transport ===
The L122 connects Merzhausen with the town of Freiburg and the municipality of Hexental.

The bus line 12, which is part of the Freiburger Verkehrs AG, connects Merzhausen with Au and Vauban, a part of Freiburg and its tram network. In addition, the bus line 7208, maintained by Südbadenbus, operates between Bad Krozingen and Freiburg train station via Vauban. Merzhausen belongs to the tariff zone of the Regio-Verkehrsverbundes Freiburg.

== Culture and Tourist Attractions ==
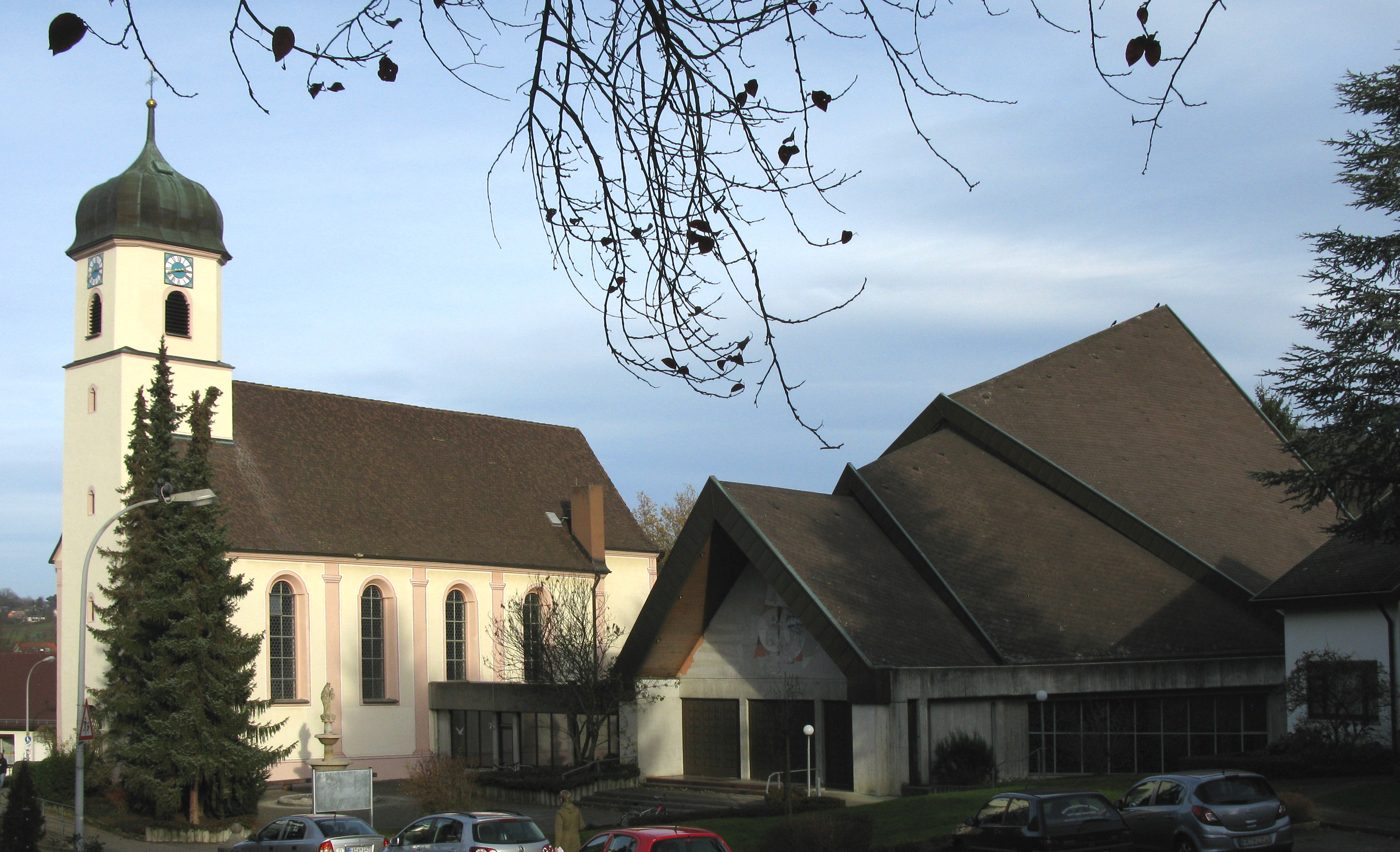
Church of St Gallus

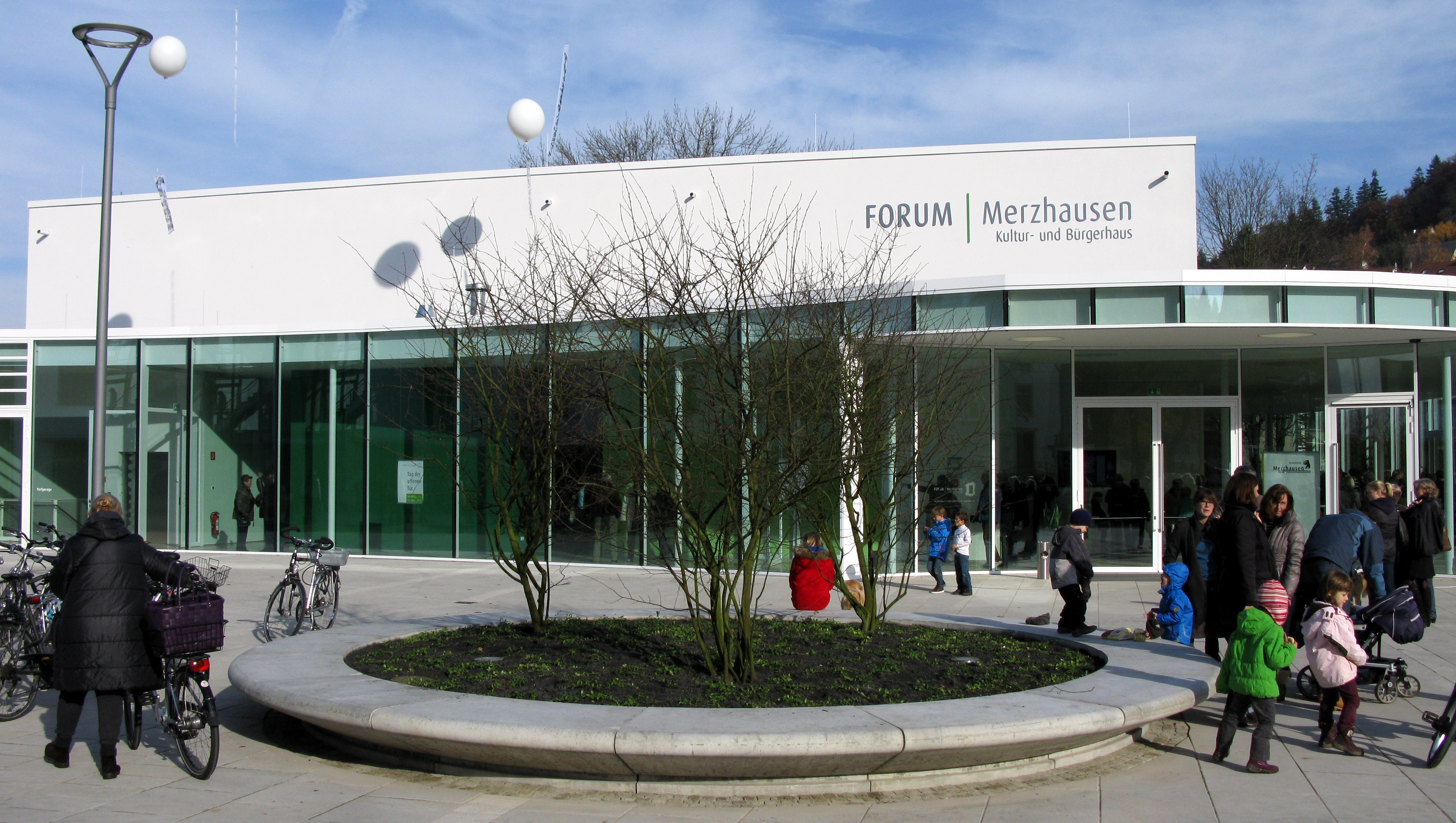
Forum Merzhausen

=== Buildings ===
The Church of St. Gallus was first mentioned in 786. The "Old Church" was built between 1759 and 1760. Next to this building, a new church was built between the years of 1976 and 1978. The "Old Church" which is connected with the new church, was renovated in 1978.

The former Jesuitenschoss of 1666 received its modern-day form in 1727 and accommodated a tavern next to a winery. In the middle of the town is the Alte Schloss (Old Castle) of Merzhausen.

The Forum Merzhausen (officially Schreibweise FORUM | Merzhausen) in the middle of town is a culture and town house and was finished in November 2012. The transparent walls surround a small hall which can seat around 120 and a separate big hall which can seat 457. Between the Forum and two residential homes is the new Marktplatz.

=== Sport, Recreation and Nature ===
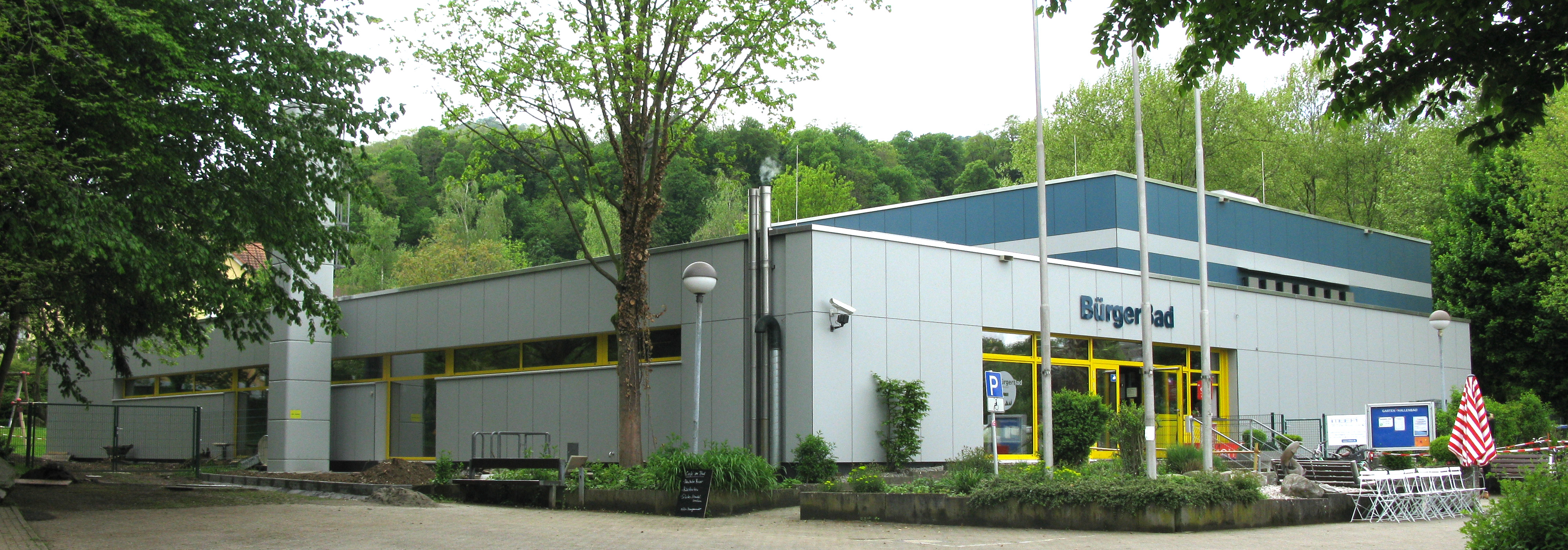
Merzhausen Swimming Pool

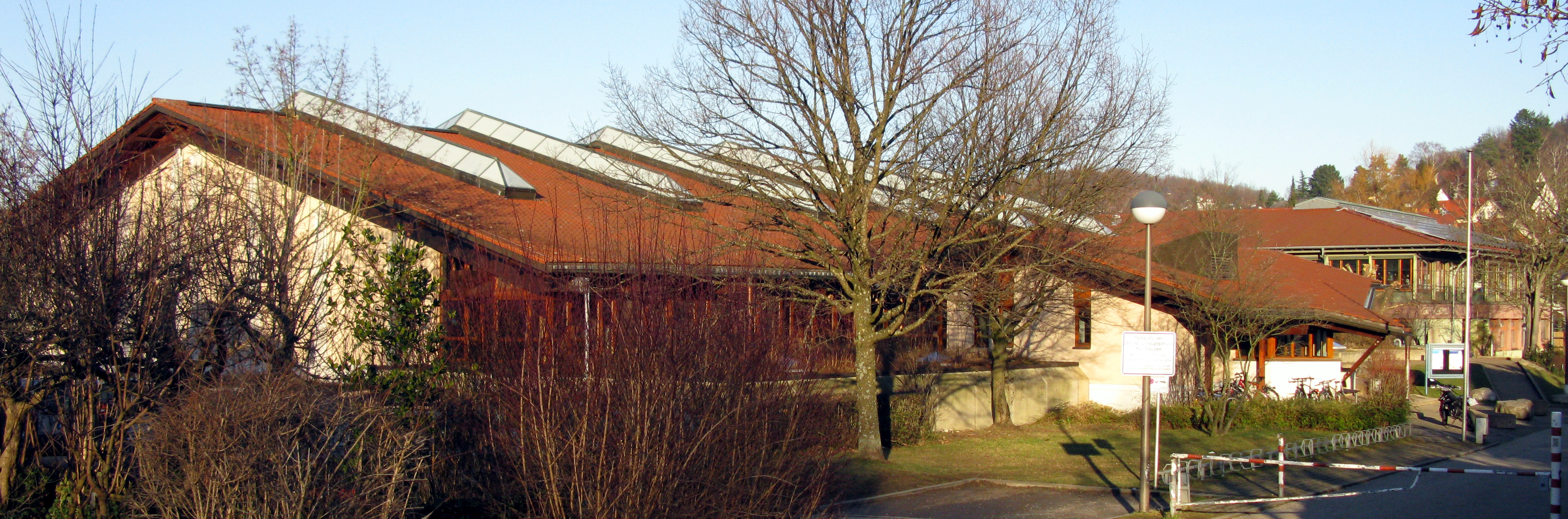
Sport Hall

There is a swimming pool in Merzhausen which has a sauna, sunbathing area and an outdoor pool for small children.

In the middle of town, there is a sports hall with a beach volleyball arena as well as at the renaturalised Dorfbach there is a wading pool. On the border with Au, the sports facilities of VfR Merzhausen have tennis courts and a sports hall.

Merzhausen is the starting point for the historical Bettlerpfad (Beggar's Path), one of the old connections, which is still used to this day as a public footpath, to Freiburg via Staufen im Breisgau and Salzburg to Badenweiler.

The village also has a lot of breathtaking nature, so much so that in 2015 successful breeding pairs of long-eared owl have been observed in a garden on the Schlossweg and been documented.

=== Events ===
Concerts and exhibitions such as Merzhausen in December take place in the Forum Merzhausen. In summer, there is a Dorfhock and on the Saturday before the 1st day of Advent there is a Christmas market on the Marktplatz.

== Personalities ==
=== Sons and Daughters of the municipality ===
- Lambert Schill (1888–1976), politician (Centre, CDU), County Member of Parliament, agriculture minister for Baden, Member of Parliament and honorary citizen of Merzhausen

=== Others ===
- Bernhard Hassenstein (born 1922), German behavioural biology, co-founder of biological cybernetics in Germany, lives in Merzhausen
- Kurt Heynicke (1891–1985) German author, lived from 1943 until his death in 1985 in Merzhausen and received the medal of merit for Merzhausen in 1974. The Kurt Heynicke Archive can be found here.
- Hugo Ott (born 1931), German historian, lives in Merzhausen
- Helmut Schmitt-Vogt (1918–2008), German practical forestry officer and forest scientist, lived from 1969 until his death in 2008 in Merzhausen
- Eugen Sumser (1930–2013) German horticulturist and since 1995 honorary citizen of Merzhausen

== Literature ==
- Karl Wißler: Merzhausen - Geschichte eines Breisgaudorfes im Hexental (Merzhausen - History of a village in Breisgau in Hexental) Verlag Karl Schillinger, Freiburg 1981, ISBN 3-921340-71-3
