= Heinrich Moser (artist) =

Heinrich August Johann Moser (1886-1947) was a German artist, known for his stained-glass windows in northeastern Brazil.

Moser became known for his works in stained glass, but also mastered painting, sculpture, as well as architecture. His works as a graphic artist is little known.

== Biography ==
Moser was born in Munich, 1886, where he studied in two art schools, and in 1910 he moved to Recife, Brazil.

Moser became famous for his work on various sacred and also profane stained-glass windows; as a painter, he worked on church ceilings, canvases and tiles; and also as a sculptor and architect. In Recife, he designed a triple-stained glass window display in 4 different locations: in the Court of Justice, the International Club of Recife, the Nossa Senhora das Gracas Church ( Our Lady of Graces Church), and the Boa Vista church. In addition, Moser was commissioned to design several profane stained-glass windows for client's houses, as was usual at that time period. His sacred art was not restricted to stained-glass, he also painted church ceilings, carved saints, church altars and so on.. He spread his knowledge and he handed down his knoledgment to local artists, such as Lula Cardoso Ayres, Aurora Lima and Nenah Boxwell.

His graphic artwork is less known but it's still relevant, as he produced illustrations for periodicals, books, catalogues and others.

Along with other artists from Pernambuco, Moser founded the "Escola de Belas Artes do Recife" (School of Fine Arts of Recife), that was later merged with “Universidade Federal de Pernambuco” (Federal University of Pernambuco).

== Death ==
He died in Recife in 1947, leaving a relevant contribution to the art and culture of the state of Pernambuco.
