= Au (Schwarzwald) =

- Municipality
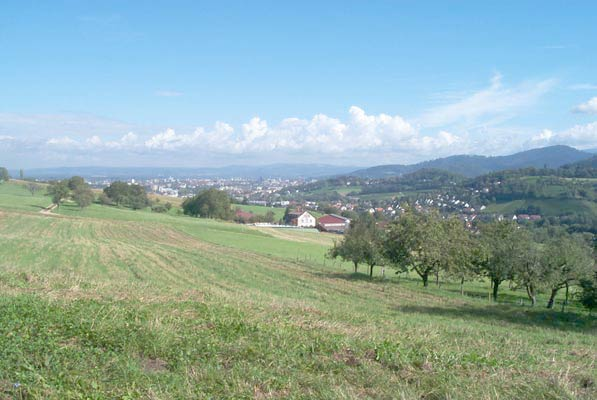

- Coat of arms

- Location of Au within Breisgau-Hochschwarzwald district
- Interactive map of Au
- Location within Germany Location within Baden-Württemberg
- Coordinates: 47°57′N 7°50′E
- Country: Germany
- State: Baden-Württemberg
- Admin. region: Freiburg
- District: Breisgau-Hochschwarzwald

Government
  - Mayor (2019–27): Jörg Kindel

Area
  - Total: 4 km^{2} (1.5 sq mi)
- Elevation: 285–643 m (935–2,110 ft)

Population (2025-12-31)
  - Total: 1,497
  - Density: 370/km^{2} (970/sq mi)
- Time zone: UTC+01:00 (CET)
  - Summer (DST): UTC+02:00 (CEST)
- Postal codes: 79280
- Dialling codes: 0761
- Vehicle registration: FR
- Website: www.au-hexental.de

Au (German pronunciation: [aʊ]) is a municipality in Breisgau-Hochschwarzwald, Baden-Württemberg, Germany. It is located a few kilometres south of Freiburg im Breisgau, in the south-western part of Baden-Württemberg. The municipality belongs to the administrative region of Hexental based in the neighbouring town of Merzhausen.

== Geography ==
=== Location ===
Au lies in the northern part of Hexental between Schönberg in the west and Black Forest to the east.

=== Local communities ===
The village of Au, Schönberg, Hof and the Hägenhof houses, and the Burghöfe, Finsterbach, Hasgelhöfe, Heimbachof, Kaischenhof, Kopfackerhof and Schwabenhöfe all belong to the municipality of Au. In the local area, there also are the abandoned village of Witraha and the abandoned castle of Obhusen. The naming of the place Niderhusun in 861, probably refers to Niederhausen, a place in the municipality of Rheinhausen (Breisgau) in the district of Emmendingen.

=== Neighbouring communities ===
Neighbouring communities include Horben in the southeast, Wittnau, Baden-Württemberg in the southwest, Ebringen in the west and Merzhausen in the north, as well as Freiburg im Breisgau to the east. All of these communities are in the district of Breisgau-Hochschwarzwald.

=== Geology ===
The Upper Rhine Plain fault line runs through Au. The Schönberg side is shaped by the remains of large landslides.

== History ==
Au was firstly recorded in print by the Cloister of St Gallen in 861. In the Middle Ages, there was very likely a castle, but the remains no longer exist. The name "Burghöfen" makes this assumption more likely. In the Thirty Years' War, Au was the battleground for the Battle of Freiburg for two days.

== Politics ==
After the local elections on 25 May 2014, the following results came in. The turnout was at 68.9%, up from 2009 (68.4%)

Christian Democratic Union of Germany	34.4%	-6.1	3 Seats	-1
Wählervereinigung Au	36%	+4.7	4 Seats	+1
WBU*	29.6%	-3.3	3 Seats	=0

*Wählergemeinschaft für Bürgernähe und Umweltschutz

=== Mayors ===
- 1980-2003: Elmar Bitzenhofer
- Since 2004: Jörg Kindel

== Economy and Infrastructure ==
=== Economy ===
Because almost half of the local land is agriculturally useful, the economic sector still plays a significant role. Among that, the local area also makes wine.
