= H. Moser & Cie. =

Watch brand

Moser Schaffhausen AG
- Type: Private
- Industry: Luxury watchmaking
- Founded: 1828 (Heinrich Moser&Cie); 2002 (Moser Schaffhausen AG)
- Founder: Heinrich Moser
- Headquarters: Schaffhausen, Switzerland
- Area served: Worldwide
- Key people: Georges-Henri Meylan (Chairman); Roger Nicholas Balsiger (Honorary chairman); Edouard Meylan (CEO)
- Products: Watches
- Production output: ~3000 (2023)
- Number of employees: ~100
- Parent: MELB Holding Group (Meylan family)
- Website: h-moser.com/en/

H. Moser & Cie. is a trademark of Moser Schaffhausen AG, a Swiss luxury watch manufacturer. The original H. Moser & Cie. was founded by the independent Swiss watchmaker Heinrich Moser in Saint Petersburg, Russia, in 1828. Notable early clients of H. Moser & Cie. included Russian princes and members of the Russian Imperial Court; Vladimir Lenin also owned a Moser watch.

After Moser died in 1874, the company was split up between its Managing Directors. One of the Swiss parts in Le Locle went to the family of Paul Girard, the business in Russia was expropriated in 1918 due to the October Revolution. In 2002, Moser Schaffhausen AG was founded by Dr. Jürgen Lange together with Heinrich Moser's great-grandson Roger Nicholas Balsiger, and the brand H. Moser & Cie. was formally re-launched in 2005.

== History ==
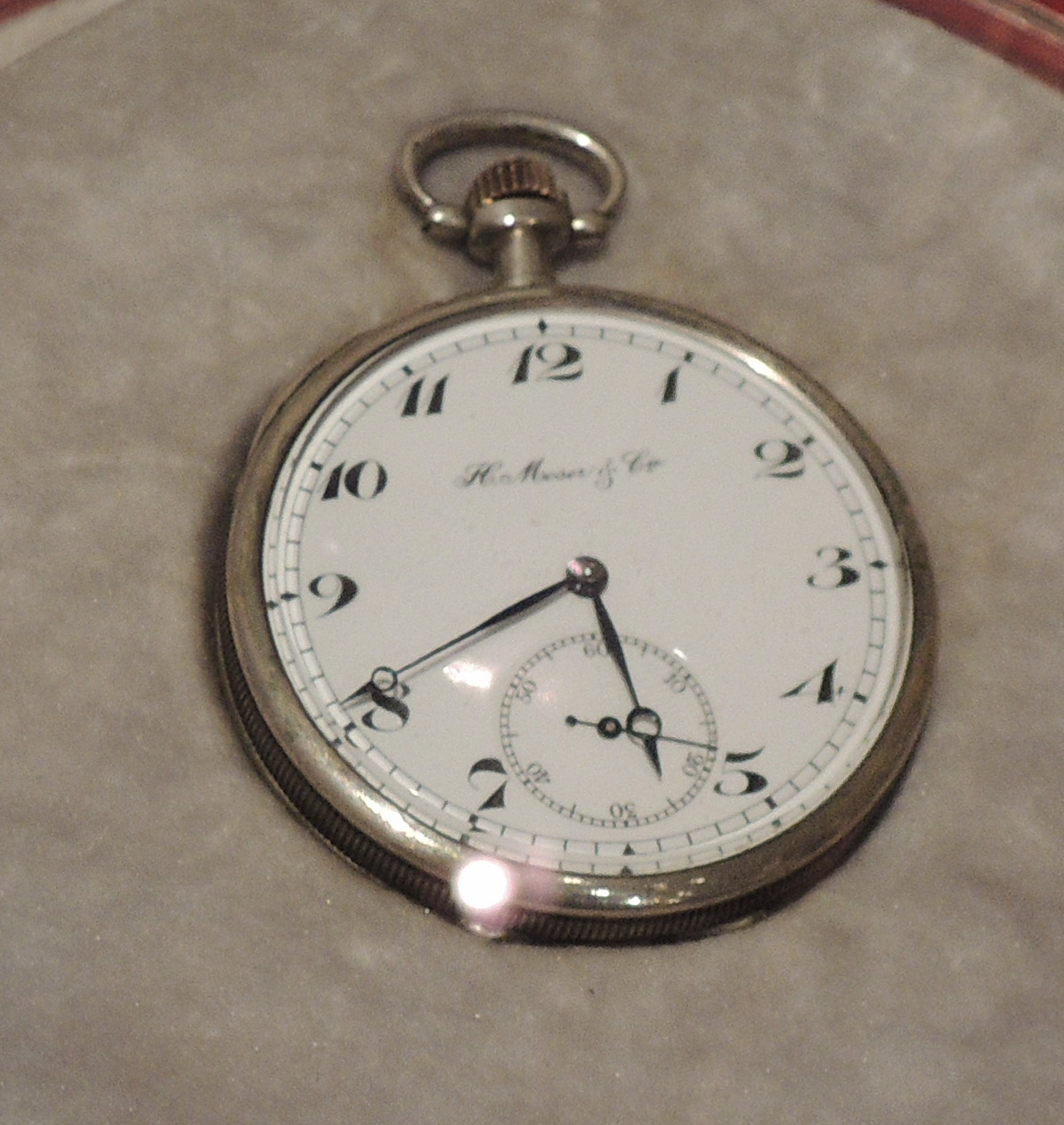
H. Moser & Cie. pocket watch owned by Vladimir Lenin.

=== Early history ===
Heinrich Moser was born in Schaffhausen, Switzerland, on 12 December 1805. He learned the basic watchmaking craftsmanship from his father Erhard, and continued his studies in Le Locle, Switzerland, after 1824.

In 1848, Heinrich Moser returned to his hometown of Schaffhausen and established a watch factory there to supply his business. Moser became one of the most important industrial pioneers in Schaffhausen, far beyond the watch industry. Together with Friedrich Peyer im Hof and Johann Conrad Neher, he founded SIG, built the first hydroelectric power station on the High Rhine and was the builder of the Rhine Falls railway.

Notable clients of H. Moser & Cie. at the time included Russian princes and members of the Russian Imperial Court. In particular, Vladimir Lenin also owned a Moser watch. Heinrich Moser died on 23 October 1874 and the company was sold to the respective Managing Directors in Switzerland and Russia since none of his heirs was willing to lead the business.

In the 20th century, H. Moser & Cie. in Le Locle shifted its focus from pocket watches to wristwatches. But due to the quartz crisis, H. Moser & Cie. became a part of the Dixi Mechanique Group and the original brand name was dropped, becoming "Hy Moser & Cie".

=== Recent development ===
In 2002, Moser Schaffhausen AG was founded by Dr. Jürgen Lange, together with Heinrich Moser's great-grandson Roger Nicholas Balsiger. In 2005, the company established a new Manufacture in Schaffhausen, Switzerland, and H. Moser & Cie. was formally re-launched as a trademark of the company.

Since 2012, H. Moser & Cie. has been owned by the MELB Holding Group of the Meylan family in Switzerland. As of 2023, H. Moser & Cie. produces around 3,000 watches a year and employs more than 100 staff members.

== Watch manufacturing ==
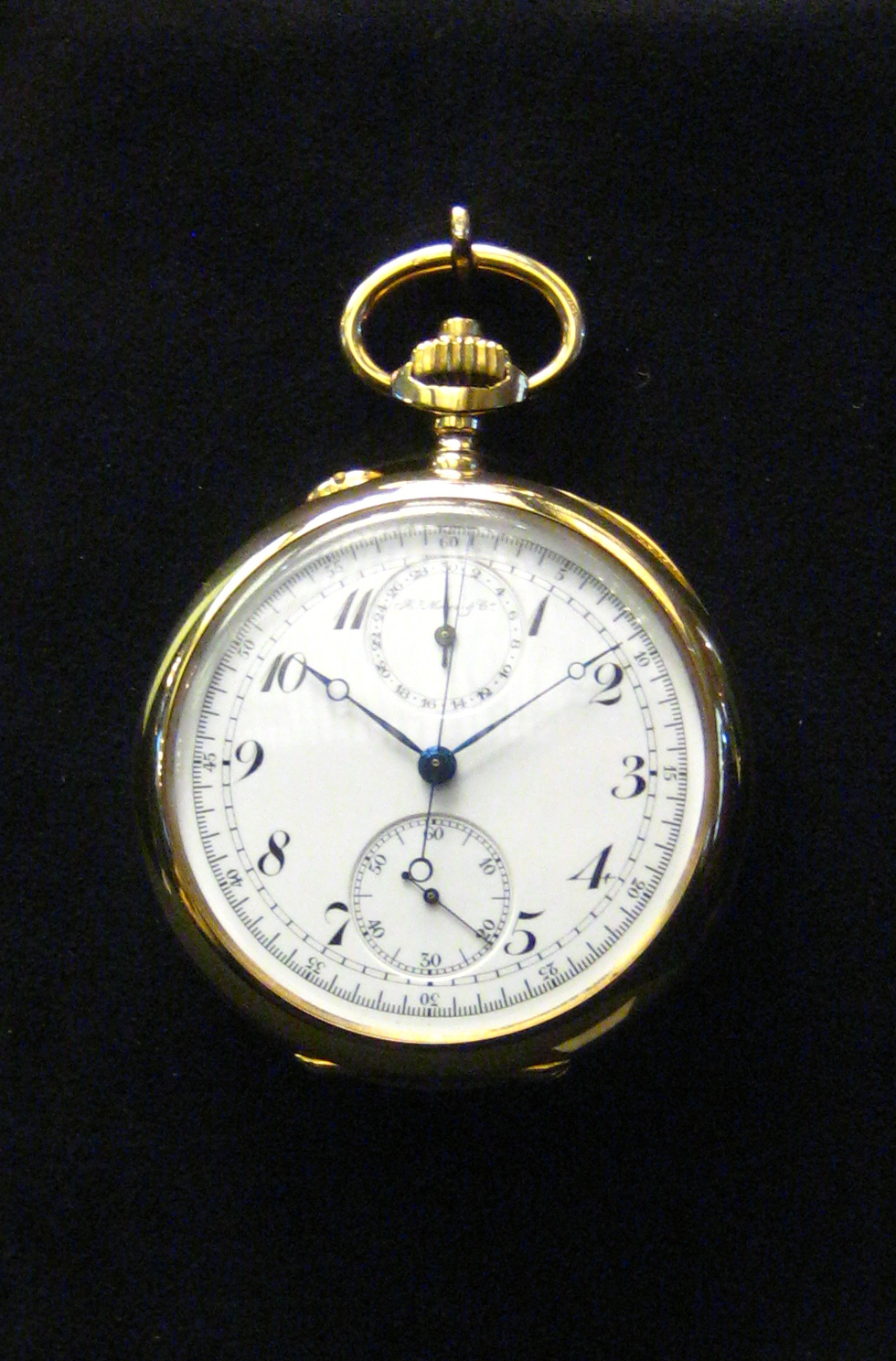
A H. Moser & Cie. pocket watch (1917).

H. Moser & Cie. manufactures its own watch components. It launched the first three watches in 2005 after the brand was revived.

In 2006, the Perpetual Calendar from H. Moser & Cie. won the Geneva Watchmaking Grand Prix.

At Baselworld 2007, H. Moser & Cie. introduced the Straumann Hairspring. The hairspring was developed jointly with H. Moser & Cie.'s associate company Precision Engineering AG in Schaffhausen. It contains a formula updated from Nivarox, an alloy composition originally invented by Dr. h.c. Reinhard Straumann in 1931.

In 2009, H. Moser & Cie. introduced their tonneau-shaped watch, the Henry. It featured a "Straumann Double Hairspring," which had two hairsprings that counter rotates as opposed to only one hairspring. The Henry was later discontinued in favor of the Swiss Alps line.

In 2022 the Pioneer Cylindrical Tourbillon Skeleton reference 3811-1200 won the tourbillon of the year at the Grand Prix d’Horlogerie de Genève.

== SIHH special watch ==
Since 2016, H. Moser & Cie. has unveiled a special watch every year at the annual Salon International de la Haute Horlogerie (SIHH) to raise public awareness on different topics.

- 2016, the Swiss Alps Watch Zzzz, a parody of Apple Watch
- 2017, the Swiss Mad Watch, with the case made of real Swiss cheese
- 2018, the Swiss Icons Watch, mixing notable features from various Swiss watch manufacturers
- 2019, the Moser Nature Watch, covered with live Swiss plants

== See also ==
- List of watch manufacturers
- Manufacture d'horlogerie
